List of Scots is an incomplete list of notable people from Scotland.

Actors

Architects and master masons

 James Adam (1732–1794), son of William Adam
 John Adam (1721–1792), eldest son of William Adam
 Robert Adam (1728–1792), architect, son of William Adam
 William Adam (1689–1748), father of James, John and Robert; architect and mason
 John Macvicar Anderson (1835–1915)
 Robert Rowand Anderson (1834–1921)
 George Ashdown Audsley (1838–1925), architect, artist, illustrator, writer, and pipe organ designer
 William James Audsley (1833–1907)
 Ormrod Maxwell Ayrton (1874–1960), FRIBA
 John Baird (1798–1859), influential figure in the development of Glasgow Georgian and Victorian Architecture
 Andrew Balfour (1863–1943), architect, work including Holmlea Primary School, Glasgow 
 Isobel Hogg Kerr Beattie (1900–1970), possibly the first woman to practise architecture in Scotland
 John Begg (1866–1937), architect who practised in London, South Africa and India, and taught at Edinburgh College of Art
 William Bryce Binnie (c. 1885–c. 1963)
 Alexander Black (c.1790–1858)
 Hippolyte Blanc (1844–1917)
 Thomas Bonnar (c.1770–1847), interior designer and architect
 James MacLellan Brown (c. 1886–1967), city architect of Dundee, designer of the Mills Observatory
 Thomas Brown (1781–1850), architect, works including Bellevue Church, Edinburgh
 Thomas Brown (1806–1872), architect notable for prison design
 Sir George Washington Browne (1853–1939)
 Sir William Bruce (c. 1630–1710)
 David Bryce (1803–1876)
 William Burn (1789–1870)
 John Burnet (1814–1901), architect who lived and practised in Glasgow
 Sir John James Burnet (1857–1938), Edwardian architect, son of John Burnet
 James Burton (1761–1837), famous London property developer and architect; father of Decimus Burton and James Burton (Egyptologist)
 James Byres of Tonley (1733–1817), architect, antiquary and dealer in Old Master paintings and antiquities
 Edward Calvert (c. 1847–1914)
 Charles Cameron (1743–1812)
 Alexander Buchanan Campbell (1914–2007)
 Alexander Lorne Campbell (1871–1944), architect founder of Scott & Campbell
 Colen Campbell (1676–1729)
 Colin Robert Vaughan Campbell, 7th Earl Cawdor (born 1962)
 John Campbell (1857–1942)
 John Chesser (1819–1892), architect largely based in Edinburgh
 Sir John Ninian Comper (1864–1960), Gothic Revival architect 
 George Corson (1829–1910)
 David Cousin (1809–1878), architect, landscape architect and planner
 James Craig (1739–1795)
 James Hoey Craigie (1870–1930)
 Alexander Hunter Crawford (1865–1945), architect and businessman, owner of Crawford's Biscuits
 Alexander Davidson (1839–1908), architect active in Australia
 William Gordon Dey (1911–1997), architect who specialised in college buildings
 John Douglas of Pinkerton (c.1709–1778), architect who designed and reformed several country houses 
 Sir Robert Drummond of Carnock (died 1592), Master of Work to the Crown of Scotland
 Sir James Duncan Dunbar-Nasmith, (born 1927), leading conservation architect
 Alan Dunlop (born 1958)
 John Murray Easton (1889–1975), architect, winner of the Royal Gold Medal for architecture
 Alexander Edward (1651–1708), Episcopalian clergyman, draughtsman, architect and landscape designer
 Archibald Elliot (1760–1823)
 Reginald Francis Joseph Fairlie (1883–1952), architect of the National Library of Scotland
 James Fergusson (1808–1886)
 Claude Waterlow Ferrier (1879–1935), architect, specialising in the Art Deco style
 James Leslie Findlay (1868–1952)
 Kathryn Findlay (born 1954)
 Robert Findlay (1859–1951)
 George Topham Forrest (1872–1945)
 William Fowler (1824–1906), architect 
 Malcolm Fraser (born 1959)
 Patrick Allan Fraser (1812–1890), architect and painter
 Andrew Frazer (died 1792)
 Thomas Gildard (died 1895), architect of Britannia Music Hall
 James Gibbs (1682–1754)
 Charles Lovett Gill (1880–1960)
 James Gowan (1923–2015), postmodernist architect of the "engineering style"
 Sir James Gowans (1821–1890), maverick Edinburgh architect and builder
 James Gillespie Graham (1776–1855)
 John Edgar Gregan (1813–1855)
 David Hamilton (1768–1843)
 Sir James Hamilton of Finnart (c.1495–1540), Master of Work to the Crown of Scotland
 Thomas Hamilton (1784–1858)
 John Henderson (1804–1862), architect chiefly remembered as a church architect
 James Macintyre Henry (1852–1929)
 William Hastie (1753/1763–1832)
 Gareth Hoskins (1967–2016), architect, UK Architect of the year 2006
 Edith Mary Wardlaw Burnet Hughes (1888–1971), considered Britain's first practising woman architect, who established her own firm in 1920
 Ernest Auldjo Jamieson (1880–1937), architect specialising in country houses, largely for wealthy family friends
 George Meikle Kemp (1795–1844), carpenter, draughtsman, and architect, best known as the designer of the Scott Monument
 Robert Kerr (1823–1904), co-founder of the Architectural Association
 Sir William Hardie Kininmonth (1904–1988), architect whose work mixed a modern style with Scottish vernacular
 Alexander Laing (1752–1823), architect
 William Leiper (1839–1916)
 David Lennox (1788–1873), bridge-builder and master stonemason, working in Australia
 John Lessels (1809–1883)
 Ian G Lindsay (1906–1966)
 Robert Lorimer (1864–1929)
 David MacGibbon (1831–1902)
 Kate Macintosh (born 1937), architect of Dawson's Heights in Southwark
 Alexander George Robertson Mackenzie (1879–1963), architect, in London and Aberdeen
 Alexander Marshall Mackenzie (1848–1933)
 Charles Rennie Mackintosh (1868–1928), architect, designer and watercolourist; husband and business partner of Margaret McDonald
 James Marjoribanks MacLaren (1853–1890), associated with the Arts and Crafts movement and Scottish Vernacular architecture
 Thomas MacLaren (1863–1928), architect who worked in worked in London, and the United States
 Andy MacMillan (1928–2014), architect, educator, writer and broadcaster
 Ebenezer James MacRae (1881–1951), City Architect for Edinburgh
 Thomas P. Marwick (1854–1927), architect based in Edinburgh, important to the architectural character of Marchmont
 Robert Matheson (1808–1877), architect and Clerk of Works for Scotland 
 Robert Matthew (1906–1975)
 John McAslan, CBE (born 1954), designed many buildings around the world, such as the new departures concourse at London King's Cross railway station, the Iron Market in Port-au-Prince and the Olympia Park in Moscow
 Alexander McGill (died 1734), mason and architect, who worked in partnership with James Smith
 John McLachlan (1843–1893), architect 
 George McRae (1858–1923), architect who migrated to Australia and pursued his career in Sydney
 Sir Frank Charles Mears (1880–1953)
 Adam Menelaws (born between 1748 and 1756–1831)
 James Miller (1860–1947)
 Sydney Mitchell (1856–1930)
 Robert Morham (1839–1912), City Architect for Edinburgh
 Richard Murphy (born 1955), architect, winner of the 2016 RIBA House of the year 
 Gordon Murray (born 1954)
 Sir James Murray of Kilbaberton (died 1634), master wright and architect
 John Mylne (died 1621), master mason
 John Mylne of Perth (c. 1585–1657), master mason
 John Mylne (1611–1667), master mason and architect
 Robert Mylne (1633–1710), stonemason and architect, last Master Mason to the Crown of Scotland
 Robert Mylne (1733–1811), architect and civil engineer, remembered for Blackfriars Bridge, London
 Walter Newall (1780–1863)
 Peter Nicholson (1765–1844)
 John Paterson (died 1832)
 Robert Hamilton Paterson (1843–1911), partner in the architectural practice, Hamilton-Paterson and Rhind
 David Paton (1801–1882), architect and builder, who worked in the United States in the 1830s
 John Dick Peddie (1824–1891)
 John More Dick Peddie (1853–1921)
 Frederick Thomas Pilkington (1832–1898)
 James Playfair (1755–1794), father of William Henry
 William Henry Playfair (1790–1857)
 B. Marcus Priteca (1889–1971)
 Robert Reid Raeburn (1819–1888), architect who worked in and around Edinburgh
 Robert Reid (1774–1856), King's architect and surveyor for Scotland
 David Rhind (1808–1883)
 James Robert Rhind (1854–1918)
 John Rhind (1836–1889), architect from Inverness
 George Richardson (c. 1737–c. 1813), architectural and decorative draftsman
 John Thomas Rochead (1814–1878)
 Thomas Ross (1839–1930)
 Fred Rowntree (1860–1927), Arts and Crafts architect
 Witold Rybczynski (born 1943)
 James Salmon (1873–1924), grandson of James Salmon (1805–1888)
 James Salmon (1805–1888), grandfather of James Salmon (1873–1924)
 William Schaw (c. 1550–1602), Master of Works to James VI of Scotland for building castles and palaces
 John Scrimgeour of Myres (fl. 16th century), Master of Work for royal buildings for James V and Mary, Queen of Scots
 James Robb Scott (1882–1965), chief architect of the Southern Railway
 James Sellars (1843–1888)
 Richard Norman Shaw (1831–1912), architect known for his country houses and for commercial buildings
 Archibald Simpson (1790–1847), one of the major architects of Aberdeen
 James Smith (c. 1645–1731)
 James Smith of Jordanhill (1782–1867), architect, merchant, antiquarian, geologist, biblical critic and man of letters
 John Smith (1781–1852), first official city architect of Aberdeen
 Robert Smith (1722–1777), emigrant to America
 William Smith (1817–1891)
 John Soutar (1881–1951)
 James Souttar (1840–1922), worked in Sweden
 Basil Spence (1907–1976)
 John James Stevenson (1831–1908)
 James Stirling (1926–1992)
 John Tait (1787–1856), architect based in Edinburgh
 Thomas S. Tait (1882–1954)
 Bruce James Talbert (1838–1881), architect and interior designer
 Sir Andrew Thomas Taylor (1850–1937), architect and Conservative Party municipal councillor
 Alexander "Greek" Thomson (1817–1875)
 James Thomson (died 1927), City Engineer, City Architect, and Housing Director of Dundee
 Ramsay Traquair, architect and academic with strong links to Canada
 James Campbell Walker (1821–1888), architect specialising in poorhouses and schools
 William Wallace (died 1631)
 Frederick Walters (1849–1931), notable for Roman Catholic churches
 George Henry Walton (1867–1933)
 Thomas Lennox Watson (c. 1850–1920)
 William Weir (1865–1950)
 Charles Wilson (1810–1863)
 Robert Wilson (1834–1901), architect for the Edinburgh Board of Education 
 George Wittet (1878–1926), architect working mostly in Bombay, India
 William Young (1843–1900), designer of Glasgow City Chambers

Artists

Businesspersons
 Robert Aitken (1734–1802), Philadelphia printer, the first to publish an English language Bible in the United States
Alexander Aikman (1755–1838), Jamaican printer, newspaper publisher, and landowner.
Arthur Anderson (1792–1868), co-founder of P&O
 Alexander Arbuthnot (died 1585), printer, work including George Buchanan's first History of Scotland
 Sir George Gough Arbuthnot (1848–1929), businessman and civic leader in British India
 John Bartholomew, Sr. (1805–1861), cartographer and engraver, founder of John Bartholomew and Son Ltd
 John Bartholomew Jr. (1831–1893), cartographer
 John Christopher Bartholomew (1923–2008), cartographer and geographer
 John George Bartholomew (1860–1920), cartographer and geographer
 John (Ian) Bartholomew (1890–1962), cartographer and geographer
 William Beardmore, 1st Baron Invernairn (1856–1936), founder of William Beardmore and Company engineers and shipbuilders
 James Gordon Bennett, Sr. (1795–1872), founder and publisher of the New York Herald
 Alexander Berry (1781–1873), town of Berry is named after him, possibly the first millionaire in Australia
 David Berry (1795–1889), livestock breeder, landowner and benefactor; brother of Alexander Berry
 Peter Buchan (1790–1854), editor, publisher, and collector of ballads and folktales
 David Buick (1854–1929), founded the Buick car company
 Sir George Burns, 1st Baronet (1795–1890), shipping magnate
 Sir James Burns (1846–1923), businessman, shipowner and philanthropist in Australia
 James Burns (1789–1871), shipowner born in Glasgow
 John Burns, 1st Baron Inverclyde (1829–1901), shipowner, chairman of Cunard
 Agnes Campbell, Lady Roseburn (1637–1716), printer, described as "Scotland's wealthiest early modern printer".
 Andrew Carnegie (1835–1919), steel magnate, major philanthropist
 Thomas Catto, 1st Baron Catto (1879–1959), businessman, Governor of the Bank of England.
 William Chambers of Glenormiston (1800–1883), publisher
 Sir Arnold Clark (1928–2017), founder of Arnold Clark motor group
 Catherine Cranston (1849–1934), leading figure in the development of tea rooms, patron of Charles Rennie Mackintosh and others
 William Cunninghame of Lainshaw (1731–1799), tobacco merchant
 David Dale (1739–1806), merchant and businessman, established the weaving community of New Lanark
 William Davidson (1740–1890), entrepreneur and founder of the first colony in New Brunswick, Canada
 Adam Dawson (1793–1873), Linlithgow and owner of St Magdalene distillery
 George Dempster of Dunnichen and Skibo (1732–1818), advocate, landowner, agricultural improver, politician and business man
 Peter Denny (1821–1895), shipbuilder and shipowner, with William Denny and Brothers
 John Dewar, Sr. (1805–1880), founder of John Dewar & Sons, Scotch whisky distillers
 Dr. Henry Duncan (1774–1846), Church of Scotland Minister; started the world's first savings bank in Ruthwell, Dumfries and Galloway
 John Elder (1824–1869), marine engineer and shipbuilder
 Sir Tom Farmer (born 1940), entrepreneur
 Robert Fleming (1845–1933), financier, founder of Robert Fleming & Co. merchant bank
 B. C. Forbes (1880–1954), founder of Forbes magazine
 Alexander Fordyce (died 1789), banker, involved in the bank run on Neal, James, Fordyce and Down in 1772
 Hugh Fraser (1817–1853), founder of House of Fraser group of department stores
 Anita Margaret Frew (born 1957), businessperson
 Martin Gilbert (born 1955), Chief Executive of Aberdeen Asset Management
 James Gillespie (1726–1797), snuff-maker and philanthropist
 Ann Gloag (born 1942), co-founder of Stagecoach Group, born in Perth
 Thomas Blake Glover (1838–1911), Nagasaki-based trader in 19th-century Japan
 Robert Gordon (1668–1731), founder of the Robert Gordon University
 Sir Angus Grossart (1937–2022), chairman of merchant bank Noble Grossart
 Andrew Halyburton (died 1507), merchant, 'Conservator of the Scottish privileges in the Low Countries'
 Willie Haughey (born 1956), entrepreneur and founder of City Refrigeration Holdings
 George Heriot (1563–1624), goldsmith and founder of George Heriot's School
 Tom Hunter (born 1961), entrepreneur and philanthropist, founder of Sports Division
 John Lawson Johnston (1839–1900), creator of Bovril
 Irvine Laidlaw (born 1942), Scotland's 6th richest man and founder of the modern conference company
 John Law (1671–1729), advocate of paper money and founder of the Mississippi Company
 Sir Thomas Lipton (1848–1931), founder of Lipton's Tea
 Sir George Mathewson, (born 1940), former chairman of the Royal Bank of Scotland
 Jim McColl (born 1951), founder of Clyde Blowers
 William McEwan (1827–1913), founder of McEwans brewers
 Stewart Milne (born 1950), founder of Stewart Milne Group and majority shareholder of Aberdeen F.C.
 Michelle Mone (born 1971), founder of Ultimo
 Sir David Murray (born 1951), founder of Murray International Metals
 Thomas Napier (1802–1881), builder, emigrant to Australia
 William Paterson (1658–1719), founder of Bank of Scotland and Bank of England
 Alexander Cameron Sim (1840–1900), pharmacist and entrepreneur active in Japan, founder of the Kobe Regatta & Athletic Club
 Robert Smith, Baron Smith of Kelvin (born 1944), Chair of the Green Investment Bank
 Brian Souter (born 1954), entrepreneur and co-founder of Stagecoach Group
 James Stirling (1800–1876), builder of steam locomotives, brother of Robert Stirling
 Thomas Sutherland (1834–1922), founder of The Hongkong and Shanghai Banking Corporation and HSBC Holdings plc
 David Couper Thomson (1861–1954), proprietor of the newspaper and publishing company D. C. Thomson & Co. Ltd
 George Thomson (1815–1866), marine engineer and shipbuilder
 William Walls (1819–1893), lawyer and industrialist, influenced the development of 19th-century Glasgow
 William Douglas Weir, 1st Viscount Weir (1877–1959), industrialist, engineer and politician
 George Watson (1654–1723), first chief accountant of the Bank of Scotland; founder of George Watson's College
 Wilson, Sons, founded in 1837 by Edward and Fleetwood Pellow Wilson; one of South America's largest shipping brokers
 Andrew Yule (1834–1902), businessman who founded Andrew Yule and Company in India
 Sir David Yule, 1st Baronet (1858–1928), businessman based in India
 George Yule (1829–1892), merchant in England and India, fourth President of the Indian National Congress

Composers
 Robert Burns (1759–1796)
 Robert Carver (c. 1485–c. 1570)
 Ronald Center (1913–1973)
 Erik Chisholm (1904–1965)
 James Clapperton (born 1968)
 John Clerk of Penicuik (1676–1755)
 James Dillon (born 1950)
 Thomas Erskine, 6th Earl of Kellie (1732–1781)
 Iain Hamilton (1922–2000)
 Tobias Hume (c.1579–1645)
 Hamish MacCunn (1868–1916)
 John Blackwood McEwen (1868–1948)
 Edward McGuire (born 1948)
 Alexander Mackenzie (1847–1935)
 Charles Macintosh (1839–1922), composer, performer and naturalist
 Robert Mackintosh (c.1745–1807)
 James MacMillan (born 1959)
 Stuart MacRae (born 1976)
 William Marshall (1748–1833)
 John McLeod (1934–2022)
 Gordon McPherson (born 1965)
 Stuart Mitchell (born 1965)
 Thea Musgrave (born 1928)
 James Oswald (1710–1769)
 Morris Pert (1947–2010)
 Francis George Scott (1880–1958)
 James Scott Skinner (1843–1927), composer, dancing master, and fiddler
 Robert Archibald Smith (1780–1829), composer known for his collection Scotish  Minstrel
 Ronald Stevenson (1928–2015)
 William Sweeney (born 1950)
 Julian Wagstaff (born 1970)
 William Wallace (1860–1940)
 Judith Weir (born 1954)
 Thomas Wilson (1927–2001)

Criminals
 William Armstrong of Kinmont (Kinmont Willie) (fl. 16th century), border reiver
 Sawney Bean, semi-mythical head of a clan in 15th- or 16th-century Scotland, reportedly executed for mass murder and cannibalism
 Bible John, nickname of supposed serial killer 
 Robert Black (born 1947), serial killer convicted of the kidnapping and murder of four girls
 Geordie Bourne (died 1597), border reiver
 Ian Brady (1938–2017), one of the Moors murderers
 Deacon Brodie (1741–1788), Edinburgh city councillor and burglar
 Michael Brown (born 1966), fraudster
 Henry John Burnett (1942–1963), murderer, last man to be hanged in Scotland
 Colonel Francis Charteris (c. 1675–1732), nicknamed "The Rape-Master General"
 Robert Crichton, 8th Lord Crichton of Sanquhar (died 1612), peer, executed for the murder of a fencing teacher, John Turner
 Williamina "Minnie" Dean (1844–1895), emigrant to New Zealand, found guilty of infanticide and hanged; the only woman to receive the death penalty in New Zealand
 William John Duff (born 1962), dentist convicted for fraud and reckless endangerment
 Paul John Ferris (born 1963), gangster and author
 Donald Forbes (1935–2008), murderer, convicted of two separate murders
 Arthur Furguson (1883–1938), con artist
 Jimmy Gauld (born 1931), footballer and match fixing ringleader
 John Gow (c. 1698–1725), notorious pirate
 Sir Robert Graham of Kinpont (died 1437), assassin of James I of Scotland
 Sir Archibald Grant 2nd Baronet (1696–1778), fraudster, expelled from parliament, and agricultural improver
 David Haggart (1801–1821), thief and murderer
 Archibald Hall (a.k.a. Roy Fontaine) (1924–2002), serial killer and thief
 James Hamilton of Bothwellhaugh and Woodhouselee (died 1581) assassin of James Stewart, 1st Earl of Moray, Regent of Scotland
 Thomas Watt Hamilton (1952–1996), perpetrator of the Dunblane school massacre
 John the Painter (1752–1777), highwayman, burglar, shoplifter, robber, and rapist, who committed acts of terror in British naval dockyards in 1776–77
 William Kidd (1645–1701), mutineer and pirate
 Sonny Leitch (born c. 1933), career criminal and jailbreaker
 "Captain" James MacLaine (1724–1750), highwayman, known as the "Gentleman Highwayman"
 Jamie Macpherson (1675–1700), outlaw
 Peter Manuel (1927–1958), serial killer
 John Maxwell, 9th Lord Maxwell (c. 1583–1613), Catholic nobleman, murderer of the Laird of Johnstone
 Edith McAlinden (born 1968), murderer, guilty of triple murder in Glasgow
 Ian McAteer (born 1961), Glasgow gangster
 William McCoy (c. 1763 – 1798), sailor and a mutineer on board HMS Bounty
 Thomas McGraw (1952–2007), known as "The Licensee" or "Wan-Baw McGraw", gangster 
 Frank McPhee (1948–2000), Glasgow gangland boss
 Patrick Meehan (1927–1994), safe blower, convicted of murder but given a royal pardon
 Anthony Joseph Miller (1941–1960), the last teenager to be executed in the United Kingdom
 Robert Mone (born 1948), convicted murderer
 James Morrison (1760–1807) seaman and mutineer who took part in the Mutiny on the Bounty
 Susan Newell (1893–1923), murderer, the last woman to be hanged in Scotland
 Dennis Nilsen (born 1945), serial killer
 Colin Norris (born 1976), nurse convicted of murdering four elderly patients in a hospital in Leeds
 Dora Noyce (1900–1977), Edinburgh brothel keeper
 Johnny Ramensky (1905–1972), career criminal who used his safe-cracking abilities as a commando during World War II
 Robert Sempill, 3rd Lord Sempill (c. 1505–1576), lord of Parliament, murderer
 Robert Stewart, Master of Atholl (died 1437), assassin of James I of Scotland
 Walter Stewart, Earl of Atholl (died 1437), assassin of James I of Scotland
 Arthur Thompson (1931–1993), Glasgow gangster
 Peter Tobin (born 1946), convicted serial killer and sex offender
 Andrew Walker (1954–2021), army corporal who killed three colleagues in a payroll robbery

Economists
 Sir Kenneth Alexander (1922–2001), university administrator
 Adam Anderson (1692/1693–1765), economic historian
 Duncan Black (1908–1991), social choice theorist
 Sir Alexander Cairncross (1911–1998), founder of the UK Government Economic Service
 Frances Anne Cairncross (born 30 August 1944), economist, journalist and academic
 John Marcus Fleming (1911–1976), IMF deputy director of research
 David Greenaway (born 1952), university administrator
 John Law (c. 1671–1729), founder of Banque Générale in France
 James Loch (1780–1855), economist, advocate, barrister, estate commissioner and Member of Parliament
 Joseph Lowe (died 1831), journalist and political economist
 Ronald MacDonald (born 1955)
 Henry Dunning Macleod (1821–1902), credit theorist
 Ailsa McKay (1963–2014), feminist economist, Professor of Economics at Glasgow Caledonian University and United Nations adviser
 Sir James Mirrlees (1936–2018), Nobel Laureate
 Anton Muscatelli (born 1962), Principal and Vice-Chancellor of the University of Glasgow
 Brian Quinn (born 1936), former Deputy Governor of the Bank of England and Chairman of Celtic FC
 John Rae (1796–1872), polymath
 Gavin Clydesdale Reid (born 1946)
 Adam Smith (1723–1790), moral philosopher, author of The Wealth of Nations, the first modern work on economics

Engineers and inventors

 James Abernethy (1814–1896), civil engineer
 Neil Arnott (1788–1874), physician and inventor of the Arnott waterbed
 Sir William Arrol (1839–1913), bridge builder
 Alexander Bain (1810–1877), inventor and engineer, first to invent and patent the electric clock and fax machine
 Charles Baird (1766–1843), engineer who played an important part in the industrial and business life of St. Petersburg
 Francis Baird (1802–1864), engineer in St. Petersburg; son of Charles Baird
 Hugh Baird (1770–1827), civil engineer, who designed and built the Union Canal
 John Logie Baird (1888–1946), television
 Nicol Hugh Baird (1796–1849), surveyor, engineer and inventor who emigrated to Canada
 Alexander Graham Bell (1847–1922), telephone, National Geographic Society, hydrofoil
 Henry Bell (1767–1830), ran Europe's first commercially successful steamboat
 Rev Patrick Bell (1799–1869), Church of Scotland minister, and inventor of the reaping machine
 George Bennie (1891–1957), the Bennie Railplane
 Sir James Black (1924–2010), beta-blockers
 Robert Blair (1748–1828), aplanatic telescope
 Benjamin Blyth (1819–1866), civil engineer
 Benjamin Blyth II (1849–1917), civil engineer
 Sir Thomas Bouch (1822–1880), railway engineer, designer of the original Tay Rail Bridge 
 Robert Henry Bow (1827–1909), civil engineer and photographer
 James Braid (1795–1860), hypnosis
 James Bremner (1784–1856), naval architect, harbour builder and ship-raiser
 David Brewster (1781–1868), lenticular stereoscope
 George Brown (1650–1730), arithmetician and inventor
 Walter Brown (1886–1957), engineer and mathematician
 Sir George Bruce of Carnock (c.1550–1625), merchant and mining engineer
 Richard Henry Brunton (1841–1901), "father of Japanese lighthouses"
 Dorothy Donaldson Buchanan (1899–1985), civil engineer, first woman member of the Institution of Civil Engineers
 Duncan Cameron (1825–1901), inventor of the "Waverley" pen nib, owner of The Oban Times newspaper
 James Chalmers (1782–1853), adhesive postage stamp
 Sir Dugald Clark (a.k.a. Clerk) (1854–1932), first two stroke cycle engine (the Clark cycle)
 Archibald Cochrane, 9th Earl of Dundonald (1749–1831), made many general useful inventions, particularly in the navy
 Thomas Cochrane, 10th Earl of Dundonald (1775–1860), designed many inventions to do with naval technology and steam engines
 Dr James C. Crow (1789–1856), creator of the sour mash process for creating bourbon whiskey
 Robert Davidson (1804–1894), first electric locomotive
 James Dewar (1842–1923), inventor of the Thermos flask and co-developer of cordite
 William Dickson (1860–1935), motion picture camera and the world's first film
 Captain Thomas Drummond (1797–1840) army officer, civil engineer, and pioneer in use of the Drummond light
 Victoria Drummond (1894–1978), marine engineer, first woman member of Institute of Marine Engineering, Science and Technology
 John Boyd Dunlop (1840–1921), the modern rubber tyre
 Henry Dyer (1848–1918), engineer, contributor to Western-style technical education in Japan
 Sir Peter Fairbairn (1799–1861), engineer and inventor, and mayor of Leeds, West Yorkshire
 Sir William Fairbairn, 1st Baronet (of Ardwick) (1789–1874), civil engineer, structural engineer and shipbuilder
 Patrick Ferguson (1744–1780), the Ferguson rifle
 Sir Alexander Fleming (1881–1955), isolated penicillin from the fungus Penicillium notatum
 Sir Sandford Fleming, (1827–1915), engineer and inventor, who emigrated to Canada; he proposed worldwide standard time zones, and engineered much of the Intercolonial Railway and the Canadian Pacific Railway
 Alexander John Forsyth (1768–1843), Presbyterian clergyman who invented the percussion cap
 William George Nicholson Geddes (1913–1993), civil engineer
 David Gow (born 1957), inventor of the i-Limb prosthetic hand
 Thomas Lomar Gray (1850–1908), engineer noted for his pioneering work in seismology
 James Gregory (1638–1675), the Gregorian telescope
 Thomas Graeme Nelson Haldane (1897–1981), engineer
 William Handyside (1793–1850), engineer involved in important construction projects in St. Petersburg
 James Harrison (1816–1893), pioneer in mechanical refrigeration
 George Johnston (1855–1945), engineer, designer and constructor of Scotland's first automobile
 James Kennedy (1797–1886), locomotive and marine engineer
 David Kirkaldy (1820–1897), engineer, whose pioneering testing works now houses the Kirkaldy Testing Museum
 James Bowman Lindsay (1799–1862), inventor of the constant electric light bulb
 Charles Macintosh (1766–1843), patented waterproofing
 Kirkpatrick MacMillan (1813–1878), bicycle
 John Loudon McAdam (1756–1836), modern road construction
 Sir Robert McAlpine (Concrete Bob) (1847–1934), road builder
 Thomas McCall (1834–1904), cartwright, developer of the bicycle
 Andrew Meikle (1719–1811), mechanical engineer, inventor of the threshing machine
 Patrick Miller (1730–1815), steamboat pioneer
 Thomas Morton (1781–1832), shipwright and inventor of the patent slip
 William Murdoch (1754–1839), pioneer of gas lighting
 David Napier (1790–1869), marine engineer
 David Napier (1785–1873), engineer, founder of D. Napier & Son, an early precision engineering company which later made automobiles and aero engines
 James Robert Napier (1821–1879), engineer and inventor of Napier's diagram
 John Napier (1550–1617), Logarithm
 Robert Napier (1791–1876), marine engineer, "the father of Clyde Shipbuilding"
 Robert D. Napier (1821–1885), engineer
 James Nasmyth (1808–1890), steam hammer
 Robert Stirling Newall (1812–1889), engineer, improved wire rope and submarine cable laying
 James Newlands (1813–1871), civil engineer, Borough Engineer of Liverpool as Borough Engineer
 Murdoch Paterson (1826–1898), Inverness engineer and architect, chief engineer of the Highland Railway
 William Paterson (1658–1719), the Bank of England
 William John Macquorn Rankine (1820–1872), developed a complete theory of the steam engine and indeed of all heat engines
 John Rennie the Elder (1761–1821), engineer, designer of the "new" 19th-century London Bridge
 John Shepherd-Barron (1925–2010), inventor of the automatic teller machine
 Hugh Smellie (1840–1891), engineer, Locomotive Superintendent
 Thomas Smith (1752–1814), early lighthouse engineer
 Charles Spalding (1738–1783), Edinburgh confectioner and improver of the diving bell
 Alan Stevenson (1807–1865), lighthouse engineer
 Charles Alexander Stevenson (1855–1950), lighthouse engineer
 David Stevenson (1815–1886), lighthouse designer
 David Alan Stevenson (1854–1938), lighthouse engineer
 Robert Stevenson (1772–1850), civil engineer, designer and builder of lighthouses
 Thomas Stevenson (1818–1887), pioneering lighthouse designer and meteorologist; father of Robert Louis Stevenson
 Matthew Stirling (1856–1931), Locomotive Superintendent of the Hull and Barnsley Railway 
 Patrick Stirling (1820–1895), railway engineer, and Locomotive Superintendent of the Great Northern Railway
 Reverend Dr Robert Stirling (1790–1878), clergyman, and inventor of the Stirling engine
 William Symington (1764–1831), engineer, built the first practical steam boat
 Thomas Telford (1757–1834), architect, civil engineer, bridge designer
 Robert William Thomson (1822–1873),
 Sir Robert Watson-Watt (1893–1973), developed radar
 James Watt (1736–1819), engineer, significantly improved the steam engine
 James Young (1811–1883), invented a way of extracting paraffin oil

Explorers
 Albert Armitage (1864–1943), Royal Navy Captain who was part of the Jackson–Harmsworth Expedition, which explored Franz Josef Land and rescued Fridtjof Nansen and his men from certain death; later part of the Discovery Expedition in Antarctica
 John Arthur, OBE (1881–1952), British Army Captain and medical missionary for over thirty years in Kenya; known simply as Doctor Arthur to generations of Africans
 William Balfour Baikie (1824–1864), naturalist, philologist and surgeon on the 1854 Niger Expedition; explored the Benue River and helped open up Nigeria to British trade while supporting the abolition of the slave trade
 Peter Belches (1796–1890), Royal Navy Lieutenant who explored the Swan River and its surrounding area while aboard Admiral Sir James Stirling's 
 Alexander Berry (1781–1873), merchant and surgeon who established the first European settlement on the south coast of New South Wales
 Henry Robertson Bowers (1883–1912), Royal Navy Lieutenant who was part of the ill-fated Terra Nova Expedition, which attempted to be the first to reach the South Pole
 Robert Brown (1842–1895), scientist, explorer, and author
 James Bruce (1730–1794), traveller and travel writer who spent more than a dozen years in North Africa and then Ethiopia, where he traced the origins of the Blue Nile
 William Speirs Bruce (1867–1921), naturalist, oceanographer, polar scientist and leader of the Scottish National Antarctic Expedition; established the first permanent weather station there and became the first to widely explore the Weddell Sea
 David Buchan (1780–1838), Royal Navy Captain who conducted expeditions in Newfoundland and Labrador and Spitsbergen
 Sir Alexander Burnes (1805–1841), diplomat and explorer of Afghanistan
 Colin Campbell (1686–1757), entrepreneur, merchant and co-founder of the Swedish East India Company, the largest trading company in Sweden throughout the 18th century; King Frederick I of Sweden's ambassador to the Emperor of China
 Hugh Clapperton (1788–1827), Royal Navy Captain and traveller who explored many lakes and rivers in Africa; one of the first white people to see Lake Chad
 John Dundas Cochrane (1793–1825), Royal Navy Captain and traveller who crossed Eurasia on foot to reach the Kamchatka Peninsula
 William Cormack (1796–1868), agriculturalist, author and philanthropist; first European to explore the interior of Newfoundland and Labrador, while also building friendly relations with the native Beothuk people
 Robert Bontine Cunninghame Graham (1852–1936), Don Roberto, adventurer, journalist, politician and writer who carried out many activities in Argentina, Mexico, Morocco, Spain and the United States
 David Douglas (1799–1834), botanist and gardener who explored parts of the remote Scottish Highlands, as well as North America and Hawaii; second person to summit Mauna Loa volcano; introduced hundreds of plants to Great Britain, including the Douglas fir
 Douglas Douglas–Hamilton (1903–1973), Lord Clydesdale, aviator and the first to see Mount Everest from above while carrying out the first detailed scientific survey of the Himalayas, the extremities he endured also helped demonstrate the need for pressurised cabins inside aircraft
 Alexander Forbes (1778–1862), author and merchant; first British consul to Mexico; published one of the first accounts in English of California (then a province of Mexico)
 Henry Ogg Forbes (1851–1932), botanist and ornithologist in both the Maluku Islands and New Guinea; director of the Canterbury Museum in New Zealand for three years
 Simon Fraser (1776–1862), fur trader who was employed by the North West Company and charted much of what is now the Canadian province of British Columbia; built the area's first trading ports; explored the 854-mile Fraser River
 George Glas (1725–1765), adventurer, merchant and seaman who traded between Brazil, the Canary Islands and north-western Africa
 Sir Alexander Richard Glen (1912–2004), explorer of the Arctic, and wartime intelligence officer
 Robert Gordon (1580–1661), antiquary, cartographer, geographer, mathematician and poet who created and revised many maps, including the first atlas of Scotland after being asked via a letter from King Charles I of England
 James Augustus Grant (1827–1892), British Army Lieutenant who accompanied John Hanning Speke in the search and discovery of the source of the River Nile; the Grant's gazelle is named in his honour
 Sir James Hector (1834–1907), geologist, naturalist and surgeon on the Palliser Expedition, the main goal of which was to find possible routes for the Canadian Pacific Railway; went on to manage what is now the Royal Society of New Zealand for thirty-five years
 Isobel Wylie Hutchison (1889–1982), Arctic traveller and botanist
 Alexander Keith Johnston (1844–1879), cartographer and geographer to a commission for the survey of Paraguay; died while leading the Royal Geographical Society's expedition to Lake Malawi
 John Kirk (1832–1922), botanist, naturalist and physician; British administrator in Zanzibar; supported the abolition of the slave trade along with his associate David Livingstone
 Alexander Gordon Laing (1793–1826), British Army Major who was the first Westerner to discover the ancient city of Timbuktu
 Macgregor Laird (1808–1861), merchant and shipbuilder; pioneered British trade on the Niger River; his ship Sirius was the first to cross the Atlantic Ocean run entirely on steam power; supported the abolition of the slave trade
 William Lithgow (1582–1645), alleged spy, traveller and writer who claimed to have peregrinated over 35,000 miles throughout various parts of the world
 David Livingstone (1813–1873), medical missionary and one of Africa's most celebrated explorers; discovered Victoria Falls, among other things; strongly opposed the slave trade; his meeting with H. M. Stanley gave rise to the quotation "Dr. Livingstone, I presume?"
 Gregor MacGregor (1786–1845), adventurer, coloniser, land speculator and soldier who fought in South America during the Spanish American wars of independence, before later helping to colonise parts of the continent
 John MacGregor (1825–1892), artist, barrister, philanthropist and travel writer; descendant of Rob Roy MacGregor; developed canoe sailing and popularised canoeing as a recreational sport, paddling and sailing them in both Europe and the Middle East
 Alistair Mackay (1878–1914), doctor and polar explorer, one of the first expedition to reach the south magnetic pole
 Sir Alexander Mackenzie (1764–1820), merchant who traced the 1,080-mile Mackenzie River and completed the first east to west overland crossing of the Americas (north of Mexico) to reach the Pacific Ocean; this predated the Lewis and Clark Expedition by a decade
 Harry McNish (1874–1930), carpenter on Sir Ernest Shackleton's Imperial Trans–Antarctic Expedition; later responsible for much of the work that ensured the crew's survival after the ship was destroyed
 Archibald Menzies (1754–1852), botanist, naturalist and surgeon on the Vancouver Expedition, which circumnavigated the globe, touched five continents and changed the course of history for the American indigenous people and the continent's European colonisation
 Sir Thomas Mitchell (1792–1855), British Army Lieutenant Colonel and surveyor in south-eastern Australia who became the Surveyor General of New South Wales; led several expeditions along the Darling River and beyond
 John Muir (1838–1914), author and naturalist whose conservation and preservation activism led to the creation of many national parks in the United States; founded the Sierra Club in California, one of the most important conservation organisations in America
 Sir John Murray (1841–1914), pioneering limnologist, marine biologist and oceanographer who assisted Charles Wyville Thomson on the Challenger expedition; first to note the existence of oceanic trenches, as well as the Mid–Atlantic Ridge
 William Hutchison Murray (1913–1996), mountaineer and writer who helped discover a route through the ice fields of Khumbu Glacier to the South Col of Mount Everest's summit, later used by Sir Edmund Hillary and Sherpa Tenzing Norgay during their historic ascent
 Walter Oudney (1790–1824), physician and African explorer, one of the first Europeans to accomplish a north–south crossing of the Sahara Desert
 Mungo Park (1771–1806), botanist and surgeon who conducted many journeys to Africa and was the first Westerner to encounter the central portion of the Niger River
 William Paterson (1755–1810), botanist, British Army Colonel and lieutenant governor, best known for leading early settlement in Tasmania
 John Rae (1813–1893), physician who explored Northern Canada, mainly surveying parts of the Northwest Passage; later reported the fate of the lost Franklin Expedition
 Sir John Richardson (1787–1865), naturalist and naval surgeon; traveled with Sir John Franklin in search of the Northwest Passage on the Coppermine Expedition of 1819–1822; they later surveyed 1,878 miles of previously unmapped coast and made many natural history discoveries
 Sir James Clark Ross (1800–1862), Royal Navy Admiral who led the first successful expedition to reach the north magnetic pole; discovered the Ross Sea, Victoria Land, and volcanoes Mount Erebus and Mount Terror in Antarctica
 Sir John Ross (1777–1856), Royal Navy Admiral who discovered the Boothia Peninsula, the Gulf of Boothia and King William Island while exploring the Arctic
 John Ross (1817–1903), drover who explored deserts, mountain ranges and rivers in South Australia, before later leading an expedition to establish a route for the Australian Overland Telegraph Line
 Alexander Selkirk (1676–1721), sailor who spent four years as a castaway after being marooned on the Juan Fernández Islands off the coast of Chile; his story is the inspiration behind Daniel Defoe's well-known character and novel Robinson Crusoe
 Henry Sinclair (c. 1345–c. 1400), nobleman rumoured to have explored Greenland and North America one hundred years before Christopher Columbus
 Sir James Stirling (1791–1865), colonial administrator and Royal Navy Admiral who established the Swan River Colony and became the first Governor of Western Australia
 John McDouall Stuart (1815–1866), surveyor and one of Australia's most famous explorers; led the first expedition to successfully traverse the continent from south to north and return
 Sir Charles Wyville Thomson (1830–1882), marine zoologist, natural historian and the chief scientist on the pioneering Challenger Expedition, which lay the foundation for modern oceanography
 Joseph Thomson (1858–1895), geologist and an important figure in the Scramble for Africa; headed many expeditions, including taking over one following the death of Alexander Keith Johnston; the Thomson's gazelle is named in his honour
 Tom Weir, MBE (1914–2006), author, broadcaster and climber who is best known for his long-running television series, Weir's Way, which helped popularise hillwalking and the great outdoors
 Thomas Braidwood Wilson (c. 1792–1843), surgeon and explorer in Australia
 John Wood (1812–1871), cartographer, naval officer and surveyor who explored many Asian rivers and compiled several maps of South Asia, which remained standard for most of the 19th century
 Sir James Wordie (1889–1962), geologist, chief of scientific staff on Sir Ernest Shackleton's Imperial Trans–Antarctic Expedition

Humorists
 Stanley Baxter (born 1926)
 Danny Bhoy (born 1974)
 Frankie Boyle (born 1972)
 Rory Bremner (born 1961)
 Kevin Bridges (born 1986)
 Janet Brown (1924–2011)
 Fred Cairns (1857–1896)
 Susan Calman
 Rhona Cameron (born 1965)
 Stephen Carlin
 Des Clarke
 Alun Cochrane (born 1975)
 Billy Connolly (born 1942)
 Ronald Balfour Corbett (born 1930), known better as Ronnie Corbett
 Ivor Cutler (1923–2006)
 Karen Dunbar (1971)
 Craig Ferguson (born 1962)
 Gregor Fisher (born 1953), known better as the character Rab C. Nesbitt
 Rikki Fulton (1924–2004)
 George Gale (1929–2003), political cartoonist
 Graeme Garden (born 1943)
 Janey Godley (born 1961)
 Greg Hemphill (born 1969)
 Craig Hill
 Armando Iannucci (born 1963)
 Phil Kay
 Ford Kiernan (born 1962)
 Harry Lauder (1870–1950)
 David Law (1908–1971), cartoonist
 Brian Limond (born 1974)
 Jimmy Logan (1928–2001)
 Fred MacAulay (born 1956)
 Doon Mackichan (born 1962)
 Chic Murray (1919–1985)
 Jerry Sadowitz (born 1961)
 Iain Stirling (born 1988)
 Ian Tough (born 1947), one half of The Krankies
 Janette Tough (born 1947), A.K.A. Wee Jimmy Krankie
 Danny Wallace (born 1976)

Military

 General James Abercrombie (1706–1781), British Army commander-in-chief of forces in North America during the French and Indian War
 Sir James Abercrombie, 1st Baronet of Edinburgh (died 1724), British Army officer and politician
 Major Sir Ralph Anstruther, 7th Baronet (1921–2002), British Army officer and courtier, awarded the Military Cross
 Major General Robert Keith Arbuthnott, 15th Viscount of Arbuthnott (1897–1966), senior British Army officer, serving in both World War I and World War II
 William Baillie, professional soldier in Swedish and Scottish Covenanter service
 General Sir David Baird, 1st Baronet (1757–1829), military leader
 Gilbert Balfour, 16th-century mercenary captain, probably having a leading role in the murder of Lord Darnley
 Michael Andreas Barclay de Tolly, Russian field marshal and minister of war during Napoleon's invasion in 1812 and War of the Sixth Coalition
 Sir Andrew Barton (c. 1466–1511), sailor from Leith, served as High Admiral of the Kingdom of Scotland
 King Robert the Bruce (1274–1329), Scotland's hero king and greatest warrior 
 Calgacus
 Donald Cameron of Lochiel (c. 1700–1748), Jacobite commander during the 1745 rising
 Richard Cameron (c. 1648–1680), Republican Covenanter and founder of the "Cameronians"
 Lady Agnes Campbell (1526–1601), military leader in Ireland
 Colin Campbell, 1st Baron Clyde (1792–1863)
 Sir Colin Campbell (died 1296), warrior of Clan Campbell
 Sandy Campbell (1898–1940), second lieutenant in the Royal Engineers, 9th Bomb Disposal Company; awarded the George Cross
 Sir Alexander Inglis Cochrane (1758–1832), senior Royal Navy commander during the Napoleonic Wars, achieving the rank of admiral
 Captain Archibald Cochrane (1783–1829), Royal Navy officer
 Colonel Hugh Stewart Cochrane (1829–1884), recipient of the Victoria Cross for his actions during the Indian Mutiny
 Air Chief Marshal the Honourable Sir Ralph Alexander Cochrane (1895–1977), pilot and Royal Air Force officer
 Thomas Cochrane, 10th Earl of Dundonald (1775–1860), Admiral in the Royal Navy
 Sir Thomas John Cochrane (1789–1872), Royal Navy First Sea Lord
 Ninian Cockburn (died 1579), soldier, officer of the Garde Écossaise, political intriguer
 Major General Samuel Cockburn (or Cobron) (c. 1574–1621), soldier in the service of Sweden
 General Sir James Henry Craig (1748–1812), British military officer and colonial administrator
 General Sir Alan Gordon Cunningham (1887–1983), British Army officer
 Admiral of the Fleet Andrew Cunningham, 1st Viscount Cunningham of Hyndhope (1883–1963), admiral of the World War II, brother of Alan
 James Currie (1756–1805), biographer of Robert Burns, early advocate of hydropathy
 Mark John Currie (1795–1874), explorer, founder settler of Western Australia, Admiral in the Royal Navy
 Field Marshal John Dalrymple, 2nd Earl of Stair (1673–1747), soldier and diplomat, commander at the Battle of Dettingen
 Tam Dalyell of the Binns (1615–1685), general
 Sir Archibald Douglas (c. 1298–1333), Regent of Scotland and leader of Scots forces at the Battle of Halidon Hill
 Sir James Douglas (c. 1287–1329), Warden of the Scottish Marches, military leader
 Air Chief Marshal Hugh Caswall Tremenheere Dowding, 1st Baron Dowding (1882–1970), Air Officer Commanding RAF Fighter Command during the Battle of Britain
 George Keith Elphinstone, 1st Viscount Keith (1746–1823), admiral active throughout the Napoleonic Wars
 Major-General William George Keith Elphinstone (1782–1842), British Army officer
 Lieutenant Francis Anthony Blair Fasson, (1913–1942), Royal Navy officer, posthumously awarded George Cross, who captured codebooks vital to breaking the Enigma cipher
 Sir Adam Ferguson (1771–1855), keeper of the regalia in Scotland
 John Forbes (1707–1759), general
 Captain Douglas Ford (1918–1943), Royal Scots officer, prisoner of war, awarded the George Cross
 Gregor Fraser, Pipe Major, 92nd (Gordon Highlanders) Regiment of Foot
 Brigadier Simon Fraser, 15th Lord Lovat (1911–1995), prominent British Commando during the World War II
 Air Vice Marshal Sir Matthew Brown Frew (1895–1974), senior officer in the Royal Air Force and World War I flying ace
 Sir James Alexander Gordon (1782–1869), distinguished British officer in the Royal Navy
 Patrick Leopold Gordon of Auchleuchries (1635–1699), general and rear admiral in Russia
 James Graham, 1st Marquess of Montrose (1612–1650), Covenanter and Royalist leader of Highland Armies
 John Graham, Viscount (Bonnie) Dundee (c. 1648–1689), Jacobite Highland Army leader
 General Sir Thomas Graham, Lord Lynedoch (1748–1843), leading Napoleonic general
 Aleksey Samuilovich Greig (1775–1845), Russian admiral
 Samuel Greig (1736–1788), Russian admiral
 Douglas Haig (1861–1928), Commander of British Forces during World War I
 General Sir James Aylmer Lowthorpe Haldane (1862–1950), senior British Army officer
 Lieutenant General Sir David Henderson (1862–1921), British Army officer, authority on tactical intelligence, first commander of the Royal Flying Corps, instrumental in establishing the Royal Air Force
 Captain Ian Henry David Henderson (1896–1918), World War I flying ace
 General Henry Sinclair Horne, 1st Baron Horne (1861–1929), World War I general
 James Innes (c. 1700–1759), military commander and political figure in the Province of North Carolina
 James John McLeod Innes (1830–1907), recipient of the Victoria Cross for action during the Indian Rebellion of 1857
 John Paul Jones (1747–1792), father of the American Navy
 Alexander Leslie, 1st Earl of Leven (1582–1661), general, soldier in Dutch, Swedish and Scottish Covenanter service
 David Leslie, 1st Lord Newark (c. 1600–1682), cavalry officer and general in Swedish and Scottish Covenanter service
 Major-General Edward Douglas Loch, 2nd Baron Loch (1873–1942), senior British Army officer
 Granville Gower Loch (1813–1853), captain in the Royal Navy, killed in action in Burma
 Henry Brougham Loch, 1st Baron Loch (1827–1900), soldier and colonial administrator
 Sir Niall mac Cailein (died 1316), (Neil Campbell), nobleman and warrior in the service of King Robert I of Scotland
 Alasdair Mac Colla (c. 1610–1647), Royalist soldier
 Rob Roy MacGregor (1671–1734)
 Hugh Mackay (c. 1640–1692), general who served during the Revolution of 1688
 Colin Mackenzie (c. 1754–1821), soldier in British India
 Alexander Slidell MacKenzie, U.S. Navy
 Ranald Slidell Mackenzie, U.S. cavalryman
 General Sir Harry Aubrey de Vere Maclean (1848–1920), general, commander of the Moroccan Army
 Major-General Sir Fitzroy Maclean, 1st Baronet (1911–1996), soldier, writer and politician; reputed to be one of the men composing the compound of "Commando types" who inspired the Ian Fleming character James Bond
 Sam McDonald (1762–1802), "Big Sam", fencibles and gatekeeper for the Prince of Wales, noted for his unusual height
 Archie McKellar (1912–1940), Battle of Britain ace pilot
 Hugh Mercer (1726–1777), Continental Army general, fatally wounded at the Battle of Princeton
 Bill Millin (1922–2010), personal piper to Simon Fraser, 15th Lord Lovat
 Robert Monro (died c. 1680), general
 Richard Montgomery, Continental army
 Admiral Sir Graham Moore (1764–1843), career officer in the Royal Navy, brother of Sir John Moore
 Lieutenant-General Sir John Moore (1761–1809), general, victor of the Battle of Corunna
 Andrew Moray (died 1297), military leader during the Scottish Wars of Independence
 Thomas Randolph, 1st Earl of Moray (c. 1278–1332), fought with King Robert I and James Lord of Douglas to regain Scotland's independence 
 Admiral Sir Charles John Napier (1786–1860), naval officer and MP
 Captain Ian Patrick Robert Napier (1895–1977), World War I flying ace credited with twelve aerial victories
 William Napier, 9th Lord Napier (1786–1834), Royal Navy officer, politician and diplomat
 John Pitcairn (1722–1775), Marine officer, killed at the battle of Bunker Hill
 John Reid (1721–1807), British general and musical composer, who left a bequest to fund a chair in Music at the University of Edinburgh
 Acting Sergeant John Rennie (1920–1943), posthumously awarded the George Cross
 Roderick Sinclair, 19th Earl of Caithness (1906–1965), British brigadier, 1st Commander of the Sri Lanka Army
 Sir James Shaw Kennedy (1788–1865), general and military writer
 John Small (died 1796), British Army officer and Lieutenant-Governor of Guernsey
 Dr John Small (1823–1879), British Deputy Surgeon General
 James Dunlop Smith (1858–1921), official in the Indian Army
 Somerled (died 1164), 12th-century warlord
 Sir David Stirling (1915–1990), British Army colonel and founder of the Special Air Service
 Sir James Stirling (1791–1865), 1st governor of Western Australia, admiral in the Royal Navy
 Lord Stirling, American Revolutionary War General
 Prince Charles Edward Stuart (1720–1788), Jacobite field marshal and heir to the throne of Great Britain
 Sir John Urry (or Hurry) (died 1650), professional soldier
 William Wallace (c. 1270–1305), a.k.a. The Wallace
 Sir Andrew Wood of Largo (died 1515), sea captain and Lord High Admiral of Scotland

Monarchs and royalty

Musicians

Philosophers
 John Abercrombie (1780–1844)
 John Anderson (1726–1796), philosopher, radical and benefactor of Anderson's Institution
 John Anderson (1893–1962)
 Alexander Bain (1818–1903), philosopher and educationalist
 Hector Boece (1465–1536), known in Latin as Boethius, first Principal of King's College in Aberdeen
 H. Bricmore (fl. 14th century), scholastic philosopher
 Thomas Brown (1778–1820)
 Thomas Carlyle (1795–1881)
 William Cleghorn (1718–1754), philosopher
 Adam Ferguson (1723–1816)
 Sir William Hamilton (1788–1888)
 Henry Home, Lord Kames (1696–1782)
 David Hume (1711–1776), inspired Immanuel Kant (himself of Scottish Heritage through his mother)
 Alasdair MacIntyre (born 1929)
 John Macmurray (1891–1976)
 John Mair, otherwise known as Major (1467–1550), teacher of George Buchanan, John Knox, and influencer of Calvin and Loyola
 William Manderstown (c. 1485–1552), philosopher and Rector of the University of Paris
 James McCosh (1811–1894)
 Thomas Reid (1710–1796), played an integral role in the Scottish Enlightenment
 Duns Scotus (1265–1308), teacher of William of Ockham
 William Small (1734–1775), Professor of Natural Philosophy at the College of William and Mary and member of the Lunar Society
 Adam Smith (1723–1790), economist, free trade, division of labour
 Dugald Stewart (1753–1828), common sense philosopher

Physicians and medical professionals
 David Abercromby (died c.1702), physician and writer
 Francis Adams (1796–1861), medical doctor and translator of Greek medical works
 Dr John Adamson (1809–1870), physician, pioneer photographer, physicist, lecturer and museum curator
 James Ormiston Affleck (1840–1922), physician and medical author
 Margaret Forbes Alexander (living), nurse, educator, researcher and writer
 William Pulteney Alison (1790–1859), physician, social reformer and philanthropist
 John Maxwell Anderson (1928–1982), surgeon and cancer specialist
 Sir Thomas McCall Anderson (1836–1908), professor of practice of medicine at the University of Glasgow
 Archibald Arnott (1772–1855), British Army surgeon best remembered as Napoleon's last doctor on St. Helena
 Asher Asher (1837–1889), first Scottish Jew to enter the medical profession
 Matthew Baillie (1761–1823), physician and pathologist
 Sir Dugald Baird (1899–1986), specializing in obstetrics and fertility
 Sir Andrew Balfour (1873–1931), medical officer who specialised in tropical medicine
 Edward Balfour (1813–1889), surgeon, orientalist and pioneering environmentalist in India
 George William Balfour (1823–1903), physician, known as a heart specialist
 Thomas Graham Balfour (1813–1891), physician noted for his work in medical statistics
 Sir George Ballingall (1780–1855), Regius Professor of military surgery
 William Mitchell Banks (1842–1904), surgeon
 Major General William Burney Bannerman (1858–1924), military surgeon
 Andrew Whyte Barclay (1817–1884), physician, Lumleian Lecturer, and Harveian Orator
 George Steward Beatson (died 1874), surgeon-general, Honorary Physician to the Queen
 Colonel Sir George Thomas Beatson (1848–1933), physician, pioneer in the field of oncology
 William Beattie (1793–1875), physician and writer
 James Begbie (1798–1869), physician, president of the Medico-Chirurgical Society of Edinburgh and of the Royal College of Physicians of Edinburgh
 James Warburton Begbie (1826–1876), physician
 Benjamin Bell of Hunthill (1749–1806), considered to be the first Scottish scientific surgeon
 Sir Charles Bell (1774–1842), surgeon, anatomist, neurologist and philosophical theologian
 John Bell (1763–1820), anatomist and surgeon
 Sir James Whyte Black (1924–2010), physician and pharmacologist, winner of the Nobel Prize in Physiology or Medicine
 Dame Emily Mathieson Blair (1892–1963), nurse, Matron-in-Chief of the Princess Mary's Royal Air Force Nursing Service and the British Red Cross Society
 Sir Gilbert Blane of Blanefield (1749–1834), physician who instituted health reform in the Royal Navy
 James Borthwick of Stow (1615–1675), surgeon and first teacher of anatomy
 James Braid (1795–1860), surgeon and "gentleman scientist", influential pioneer of hypnotism and hypnotherapy
 John Milne Bramwell (1852–1925), physician, surgeon and medical hypnotist
 William A. F. Browne (1805–1885), one of the most significant asylum doctors of the nineteenth century
 Sir Thomas Lauder Brunton (1844–1916), physician known for treatment of angina pectoris
 William Buchan (1729–1805), physician, writer on medicine for a lay readership
 Maura Buchanan (living), nursing administrator, former president of the Royal College of Nursing
 Francis Buchanan-Hamilton (1762–1829), physician who made significant contributions as a geographer, zoologist, and botanist while living in India
 Sir Thomas Burnet (1638–1704), physician to Charles II, James II, William and Mary, and Queen Anne
 Ewan Cameron (1922–1991), physician who worked with Linus Pauling on Vitamin C research
 Murdoch Cameron (1847–1930), Regius Professor of Midwifery at the University of Glasgow
 Robina Thomson Cameron (1892–1971), district nurse, community leader and nursing inspector
 Dugald Campbell (died 1940), doctor from the isle of Arran; government physician on Hawaii
 Sir James Cantlie (1851–1926), physician, pioneer of First aid
 John Cheyne (1777–1836), physician, and medical writer; identified Cheyne–Stokes respiration, with William Stokes
 Colin Chisholm (1755–1825), surgeon, medical writer and Fellow of the Royal Society
 Mairi Lambert Gooden-Chisholm of Chisholm (1896–1981), military nurse and ambulance driver during World War I, awarded the Military Medal
 Sir Robert Christison (1797–1882), toxicologist and physician 
 Sir James Clark (1788–1870), physician who was Physician-in-Ordinary to Queen Victoria 
 Hugh Francis Clarke Cleghorn of Stravithie (1820–1895), physician, botanist, and forester who worked in India
 Sir Thomas Smith Clouston (1840–1915), psychiatrist
 Dr Samuel Cockburn (1823–1915), advocate and practitioner of homeopathy
 John Coldstream (1806–1863), physician
 James Copland (1791–1870), physician and prolific medical writer
 John Craig (died 1620), physician and astronomer; physician to James VI of Scotland
 David Craigie (1793–1866), physician and medical writer
 Sir Alexander Crichton (1763–1856), physician, including the Emperor of Russia's personal physician, and author
 Sir James Crichton-Browne (1840–1938), leading psychiatrist and medical psychologist
 William Cumin (died 1854), Regius Professor of Obstetrics and Gynaecology at the University of Glasgow
 David Douglas Cunningham (1843–1914), doctor and researcher in India, pioneer in aerobiology
 Daniel John Cunningham (1850–1909), physician, zoologist, and anatomist; author of medical textbooks
 Sir David Deas (1807–1876), medical officer in the Royal Navy
 Ian Donald (1910–1987), physician, pioneer of the use of diagnostic ultrasound in medicine
 Sir David Dumbreck (1805–1876), British Army medical officer
 Andrew Duncan, the elder (1744–1828), physician, professor at Edinburgh University, pioneer of forensic medicine
 Andrew Duncan, the younger (1773–1832), physician, first professor of medical jurisprudence at Edinburgh University
 James Matthews Duncan (1826–1890), physician, practitioner of and author on obstetrics
 William Ronald Dodds Fairbairn (1889–1964), psychiatrist, psychoanalyst, central figure in the development of the object relations theory of psychoanalysis
 Sir Walter Farquhar (1738–1819), physician, whose clientele included the future King George IV and William Pitt the Younger
 William Fergusson (1773–1846), inspector-general of military hospitals; medical writer
 Charles Finnigan (1901–1967), dental surgeon, Surgeon Rear-Admiral in the Royal Navy, Honorary Dental Surgeon to the Queen
 James Forbes (1779–1837), inspector-general of army hospitals
 George Fordyce (1736–1802), physician, lecturer on medicine, and chemist
 Sir William Fordyce (1724–1792), physician, voted a gold medal for his work on rhubarb by the Society of Arts
 David Kennedy Fraser (1888–1962), psychologist, educator and amateur mathematician
 Margaret Neill Fraser (1880–1915), First World War nurse and notable amateur golfer, who died in Serbia
 John Gairdner (1790–1876), physician and president of the College of Surgeons of Edinburgh
 Sir William Tennant Gairdner (1824–1907), Professor of Medicine in the University of Glasgow
 Maxwell Garthshore (1732–1812), physician
 Marion Gilchrist (1864–1952), first female graduate of the University of Glasgow; first woman to qualify in medicine from a Scottish university; leading activist in Women's suffrage movement
 Theodore Gordon (1786–1845), inspector of army hospitals
 Robert Edmond Grant (1793–1874), physician and biologist
 James Gregory (1753–1821), physician and classicist
 Jane Stocks Greig (1872–1939), medical doctor and public health specialist in Australia
 Robert Marcus Gunn (1850–1909), ophthalmologist
 Daniel Rutherford Haldane (1824–1887), prominent physician, president of the Royal College of Physicians of Edinburgh
 Evelina Haverfield (1867–1920), suffragette and World War I nurse in Serbia
 Alexander Henderson (1780–1863), physician and author
 David Kennedy Henderson (1884–1965), psychiatrist
 Sir James William Beeman Hodsdon (1858–1928) eminent surgeon, president of the Royal College of Surgeons of Edinburgh 1914–1917
 Thomas Charles Hope (1766–1844), physician and chemist, discoverer of the element strontium
 Joseph Hume (1777–1855), physician and Radical MP
 John Hunter (1728–1793), surgeon, after whom the Hunterian Museum at the Royal College of Surgeons is named
 Sir Robert Hutchison (1871–1960), physician and paediatrician
 Elsie Inglis (1864–1917), medical reformer and suffragette
 John Scott Inkster, (1924-2011) anesthesiologist
 Robert Jackson (1750–1827), physician-surgeon, reformer, and inspector-general of army hospitals
 Louisa Jordan (1878–1915), nurse who died in Serbia during the First World War; NHS Louisa Jordan Hospital was named after her
 James Keill (1673–1719), physician, philosopher, medical writer and translator
 John Martin Munro Kerr (1868–1960), Regius Professor of Midwifery at the University of Glasgow
 R. D. Laing (1927–1989), psychiatrist and author
 Thomas Latta (1796–1833), pioneer of the saline solution method of treatment
 John Lauder (1683–1737), surgeon, deacon of the Royal College of Surgeons of Edinburgh
 Robert Lee (1793–1877), obstetrician, and personal physician to Prince Mikhail Semyonovich Vorontsov, Governor-General of the Crimea
 Lieutenant-General Sir William Boog Leishman (1865–1926), pathologist and army medical officer
 Sir John Liddell (1794–1868), Director-General of the Medical Department of the Royal Navy; senior medical officer of the Royal Hospital at Greenwich
 James Lind (1716–1794), physician, pioneer of naval hygiene in the Royal Navy
 Sir Henry Duncan Littlejohn (1826–1914), surgeon, forensic scientist and public health pioneer
 Robert Lumsden (1903–1973), ear, nose and throat (ENT) surgeon
 Sir William Macewen (1848–1924), surgeon, pioneer in modern brain surgery
 Jessie MacLaren MacGregor (1863–1906), one of the first women to be awarded an MD from the University of Edinburgh
 William Mackenzie (1791–1868), ophthalmologist, who wrote one of the first British textbooks of ophthalmology
 Sir William Alexander Mackinnon (1830–1897), Director-General of the British Army Medical Service
 Thomas John MacLagan (1838–1903), Dundee doctor and pharmacologist
 Patrick Manson (1844–1922), physician who made important discoveries in parasitology, founder of the field of tropical medicine
 Mary Adamson Anderson Marshall (1837–1910), physician, one of the members of the Edinburgh Seven, the first women to study medicine at the University of Edinburgh
 Douglas Mary McKain (1789–1873), New Zealand nurse, midwife and businesswoman
 Agnes McLaren (1837–1913), doctor, first to give medical assistance to women in India 
 Gavin Milroy (1805–1886), physician and medical writer
 Alexander Monteith of Auldcathie (1660–1713), surgeon, deacon of the Incorporation of Surgeons of Edinburgh
 Neil Gordon Munro (1863–1942), physician and anthropologist, who studied the Ainu people
 Flora Murray (1869–1923), medical pioneer, and a member of the Women's Social and Political Union suffragettes
 Sir Robin MacGregor Murray (born 1944), psychiatrist and Professor of Psychiatric Research
 Duncan Napier, Victorian botanist and medical herbalist
 Sir Alexander Nisbet (1795–1874), naval surgeon, H.M. Inspector of Hospitals for the Royal Navy
 William Nisbet (1759–1822), physician, author of widely used medical books that emphasized practice
 Sir Alexander Ogston (1844–1929), surgeon, famous for his discovery of Staphylococcus
 Alexander Pennycuik (1605–1695), military surgeon, Surgeon General of the Scots forces in Ireland
 David Pitcairn (1749–1809), physician
 Archibald Pitcairne (1652–1713), physician and author
 Richard Poole (1783–1871), physician, psychiatrist, and phrenologist
 George Hogarth Pringle (1830–1872), surgeon, pioneer of antiseptic surgery in Australia
 John James Pringle (1855–1922), dermatologist
 Laidlaw Purves (1842–1917), aural and ophthalmic surgeon
 John Rattray (1707–1771), surgeon, surgeon to Prince Charles Edward Stuart and golfer
 David Boswell Reid (1805–1863), physician, chemist and inventor
 Agnes Reston (1771–1856), wartime nurse during the Peninsular War, known as the Heroine of Matagorda, for her outstanding bravery
 John Roberton (1776–1840), physician and social reformer
 John Roberton (1797–1876), physician and social reformer
 Thomas Ferguson Rodger (1907–1978), physician, Royal Army Medical Corps brigadier, and Professor of Psychological Medicine
 Elizabeth Ness MacBean Ross (1878–1915), physician who worked in Persia, and died in Serbia
 Catherine Murray Roy, military nurse during World War I, awarded the Military Medal for conspicuous gallantry
 John Rutherford (1695–1779), physician and professor at the University of Edinburgh Medical School; grandfather of Sir Walter Scott
 Helenus Scott (1760–1821), physician, active in India
 Lyall Stuart Scott (1920–1977), surgeon and urologist
 Thomas Shortt (1788–1843), army physician, who drafted Napoleon's official autopsy report
 James Young Simpson (1811–1870), introduced chloroform into surgery
 David Skae (1814–1873), physician who specialised in psychological medicine
 Alexander Small (1710–1794), surgeon and scholar
 John Smith (1825–1910), dentist, philanthropist and pioneering educator, founder of the Edinburgh school of dentistry
 James Carmichael Smyth (1741–1821), physician and medical writer
 William Somerville (1771–1860), physician, inspector of the Army Medical Board, husband of Mary Somerville
 James Syme (1799–1870), pioneering surgeon
 Michael Waistell Taylor (1824–1892), physician and antiquary
 Thomas Stewart Traill (1781–1862), physician, chemist, mineralogist, meteorologist, zoologist and scholar of medical jurisprudence
 Gordon Turnbull, psychiatrist and author
 Andrew Ure (1778–1857), physician, scholar and chemist
 Charles Howard Usher (1865–1942), ophthalmologist
 James Wardrop (1782–1869), surgeon and ophthalmologist
 Robert Watt (1774–1819), physician and bibliographer
 Alexander Allan Innes Wedderburn (9 May 1935 – 23 February 2017), psychologist and Emeritus Professor of Psychology at the Heriot-Watt University.
 Sir David Wilkie (1882–1938), surgeon, pioneer of surgical research and undergraduate teaching
 Robert Willis (1799–1878), physician, librarian, and medical historian
 James Wilson (1765–1821), anatomist
 Professor Nairn Hutchison Fulton Wilson (born 1950), Honorary Professor of Dentistry, former Dean and Head of King's College London Dental Institute
 Alexander Wood (1725–1807), surgeon, and friend of the poet Robert Burns
 Alexander Wood (1817–1884), physician, inventor of the first true hypodermic syringe
 John McLeod (surgeon) (c. 1777 – 1820), naval surgeon and travel writer

Rulers and politicians

 Sir William Arbuthnot, 1st Baronet (1766–1829), Lord Provost of Edinburgh and Lord Lieutenant of the City of Edinburgh
 James Abercromby, 1st Baron Dunfermline (1776–1858), barrister and Speaker of the House of Commons between 1835 and 1839
 Sir Andrew Agnew, 7th Baronet (1793–1849), politician and prominent promoter of Sunday Sabbatarianism
 James Alexander (1691–1756), attorney general of New Jersey
 John Baird (1790–1820), revolutionary
 Robert Barton of Over Barnton (died 1540), merchant, sailor and politician; as Comptroller, Master of the Mint and Lord High Treasurer
 Cardinal David Beaton (c. 1494–1546)
 Dr. James Beaton (1473–1539), church leader, and the Keeper of the Great Seal of Scotland
 Sir Robert Duncan Bell (1878–1953), colonial administrator in India; Acting Governor of Bombay in 1937
 Tony Blair (born 1953), Labour Prime Minister of the United Kingdom (1997–2007)
 Henry Brougham, 1st Baron Brougham and Vaux (1778–1868), statesman, one of the founders of the Edinburgh Review, Lord Chancellor
 Gordon Brown (born 1951), Labour Prime Minister of the United Kingdom (2007–2010)
 James Bryce, 1st Viscount Bryce, (1838–1922), academic, jurist, historian and Liberal politician
 Sir Henry Campbell-Bannerman (1836–1908), statesman, Liberal Party politician and Prime Minister of the United Kingdom (1905–1908)
 Alexander Chalmers (Polish: Aleksander Czamer) (1645–1703), four time mayor of Warsaw
 Charles I of Scotland and of England (1625–1649)
 Sir Hugh Cleghorn (1752–1837), first colonial secretary to Ceylon
 Adam Cockburn, Laird of Ormiston, Lord Ormiston (1656–1735), administrator, politician and judge
 Sir Alexander Cockburn, 12th Baronet (1802–1880), lawyer, politician and judge, Lord Chief Justice of England and Wales
 Archibald Cockburn (c. 1738–1820), politician
 John Cockburn of Ormiston (died 1583), early supporter of the Scottish Reformation
 John Cockburn of Ormiston (died 1758), politician, known as the father of Scottish husbandry
 Sir Richard Cockburn of Clerkington (died 1627), senior government official, Keeper of the Privy Seal of Scotland
 James Connolly (1868–1916), Irish socialist leader, executed by firing squad following the Easter Rising
 John Crawfurd (1783–1868), colonial administrator, diplomat, physician and author
 Dubacan of Angus (fl 10th century), first  named mormaer, Mormaer of Angus
 Robert Bontine Cunninghame Graham ("Don Roberto") (1852–1936), first socialist Member of Parliament (MP)
 Sir Frederick Currie, 1st Baronet (1799–1875)
 James Dalrymple, 1st Viscount of Stair (1619–1695), lawyer and statesman
 John Dalrymple, 1st Earl of Stair, Secretary of State over Scotland, implicated in the Massacre of Glencoe
 Tam Dalyell (born 1932), British Labour politician
 Ian Davidson (born 1950), Labour Co-operative politician
 Ruth Davidson (born 1978), leader of the Scottish Conservative Party since 2011
 Donald Dewar (1937–2000), former First Minister of Scotland
 Robert Dinwiddie (1693–1770), Lieutenant-Governor of Virginia 1751–1758
 James Douglas, 4th Earl of Morton (1525–1581), Regent of Scotland
 Alec Douglas-Home (1903–1995), Conservative Prime minister of the United Kingdom
 Iain Duncan Smith (born 1954), leader of the Conservative party
 Henry Dundas, 1st Viscount Melville (1742–1811), advocate and Tory politician
 Mountstuart Elphinstone (1779–1859), statesman and historian, associated with the government of British India
 William Elphinstone (1431–1514), statesman, Bishop of Aberdeen and founder of the University of Aberdeen
 Alex Fergusson (1949–2018), third Presiding Officer of the Scottish Parliament
 Andrew Fletcher of Saltoun (1653–1716)
 Archibald Fletcher (1746–1828), political reformer
 Liam Fox (born 1961), Conservative politician
 George Galloway (born 1954), Respect Party
 Annabel Goldie (born 1950), former leader of the Scottish Conservative Party
 Charles Grant, 1st Baron Glenelg (1778–1866), politician and colonial administrator
 Sir Robert Grant (1779–1838), lawyer and politician
 Iain Gray (born 1957), Scottish Labour Party politician
 Jo Grimond (1913–1993), Liberal Party leader from 1956 to 1967
 James Hamilton, 2nd Earl of Arran (1516–1575), Regent of Scotland
 Andrew Hardie (died 1820), revolutionary
 Keir Hardie (1856–1915)
 Patrick Harvie (born 1973), co-convenor of the Scottish Greens since 2003
 Alexander Henderson (c. 1583–1646), theologian, ecclesiastical statesman and co-author of the National Covenant
 David B. Henderson (1840–1906), politician and Speaker of the United States House of Representatives from 1899 to 1903
 Hugh Henry (born 1952), Scottish Labour politician
 Francis Horner (1778–1817), Whig politician, journalist, lawyer and political economist
 King James IV (1473–1513)
 James VI of Scotland and I of England (1603–1625)
 Archibald Johnston, Lord Warriston (1611–1663), judge, statesman and co-author of the National Covenant
 James Johnston (1655–1737), envoy extraordinary to Prussia, Secretary of State over Scotland, and Lord Clerk Register
 Charles Kennedy (1959–2015), leader of the Liberal Democrats 1999–2006
 Sir William Kirkcaldy of Grange (c. 1520–1573), politician and soldier, who held Edinburgh Castle on behalf of Mary, Queen of Scots
 Johann Lamont (born 1957), leader of the Scottish Labour Party since 2011
 John Loughton (born 1987), political campaigner and winner of reality show Big Brother: Celebrity Hijack in 2008
 Sir John Lyon, Thane of Glamis (c1340–1382), Chamberlain of Scotland between 1377 and 1382
 Arthur MacArthur, Sr. Governor of Wisconsin and grandfather of Gen. Douglas MacArthur
 Macbeth of Scotland (c. 1005–1057), High King of Scotland
 John MacCormick (1904–1961), nationalist
 John A. Macdonald (1815–1891), first Prime Minister of Canada
 Malcolm MacDonald (1901–1981)
 Ramsay MacDonald (1866–1937), Prime Minister of the United Kingdom
 Ken Macintosh (born 1962), fifth Presiding Officer of the Scottish Parliament
 Alexander Mackenzie (1822–1892), second Prime Minister of Canada
 John P Mackintosh (1929–1978), Labour MP, Politics Professor at Edinburgh University and proponent of devolution
 John MacLean (1879–1923), revolutionary
 Máel Coluim, Earl of Angus (fl 13th century), mormaer of Angus c.1214-1240; last of the male line with that title
 Tricia Marwick (born 1953), fourth Presiding Officer of the Scottish Parliament
 Mary, Queen of Scots (1542–1587)
 Jimmy Maxton (1885–1946), leader of the Independent Labour Party
 Jack McConnell (born 1960), First Minister of Scotland (2001–2007)
 Christina McKelvie (born 1968), Scottish National Party
 William McKinley (1843–1901), US President
 Henry McLeish (born 1948), former First Minister
 Duncan McNeill, 1st Baron Colonsay (1793–1874), advocate, judge and Tory politician
 George Mealmaker (1768–1808), radical organiser and writer
 Thomas Muir (1765–1799), political reformer
 John Murdoch (1818–1903), land reform campaigner, newspaper owner and editor 
 Jim Murphy (born 1967), Labour Party
 Robert Dale Owen (1801–1877), American social reformer and politician
 Jerry Rawlings (born 1947), former president of Ghana; partly of Scottish descent
 George Reid (born 1939), second Presiding Officer of the Scottish Parliament 2003–2007 
 Jimmy Reid (1932–2010), trade union activist, orator, politician, and journalist
 Willie Rennie (born 1967), leader of the Scottish Liberal Democrats since 2011
 Alex Salmond (born 1954), former First Minister of Scotland (2007–14) and former leader of the Scottish National Party
 Sir John Scot, Lord Scotstarvit (1585–1670), laird, advocate, judge, politician and author
 Tavish Scott (born 1956), former leader of the Scottish Liberal Democrats
 Tommy Sheridan (born 1964), Solidarity
 Jim Sillars (born 1937), founder of Scottish Labour Party, MP
 Archibald Sinclair, 1st Viscount Thurso (1890–1970), Liberal Party leader from 1935 to 1945
 William Skirving (c. 1745–1796), radical
 John Smith (1938–1994), Labour Party leader
 David Steel (born 1938), Liberal Party leader from 1976 to 1988, first Presiding Officer of the Scottish Parliament
 Nicol Stephen (born 1960), former leader of the Scottish Liberal Democrats
 Nicola Sturgeon (born 1970), First Minister of Scotland (since 2014) and Leader of the Scottish National Party
 John Swinney (born 1964), Scottish National Party (SNP) politician
 Alexander Wedderburn, 1st Earl of Rosslyn (1733–1805), Lord Chancellor of Great Britain from 1793 to 1801
 Sir William Wedderburn, 4th Baronet (1838–1918), civil servant in India and politician
 Elizabeth (Eliza) Wigham (1820–1899), leading suffragist and abolitionist
 Jane Wigham (née Smeal) (1801–1888), leading Scottish abolitionist
 James Wilson (1760–1820), revolutionary
 James Wilson (1742–1798), one of the Founding Fathers of the United States, signatory of the United States Declaration of Independence
 Robert Crichton Wyllie (1798–1865), physician and businessman, Minister of Foreign Affairs in the Kingdom of Hawaii

Scientists

Sportspeople

 Gary Anderson (born 1970), professional darts player
 Robert Archibald (1980–2020), first Scottish NBA player
 John Baird (1870–1905), footballer
 Imogen Bankier (born 1987), badminton player, winner of the national championships
 Alain Baxter (born 1973), alpine skier
 Jim Baxter (1939–2001), footballer
 Andy Beattie (1913–1983), professional football player and manager, the first manager of the Scottish national team
 Eric Brown (1925–1986), professional golfer
 Hamish Brown (born 1934), first person to walk all the Munros in a single trip
 Kathryn Bryce (born 1997), cricketer in Scotland women's national cricket team, first Scots cricketer in the top ten of the ICC Women's Player Rankings
 Sarah Bryce (born 2000), cricketer in Scotland women's national cricket team
 Ken Buchanan (born 1945), world champion boxer
 Euan Burton (born 1979), judo expert, who represented Great Britain at the 2008 and 2012 Summer Olympics in the Half-Middleweight (under 81 kg) Judo event
 Sir Matt Busby (1909–1994), former football manager, won the European Cup in 1968
 John Bute (also known as Johnny Dumfries) (1958-2021), peer and racing driver, winner of the 1988 24 Hours of Le Mans
 Willie Carson (born 1942), jockey
 Jim Clark (1936–1968), Formula One driver
 John Cochrane (1798–1878), chess player
 Steph Cook (born 1972), modern pentathlete, Olympic gold medallist
 Gillian Cooke (born 1982), athlete and bobsledder
 Davie Cooper (1956–1995), footballer
 Kay Copland, sport shooter
 David Coulthard (born 1971), Formula One driver
 Stevie Crawford, professional football player and coach of Dunfermline Athletic F.C.
 Kenny Dalglish (born 1951), retired footballer and former manager of Liverpool F.C.
 George Fairbairn, professional rugby league footballer and Scotland coach
 Crawford Fairbrother (1936–1986), Olympic high jumper
 Sir Alex Ferguson (born 1941), retired footballer and former manager of Manchester United F.C.
 Darren Fletcher (born 1984), international footballer
 Ron Flockhart (1923–1962), racing driver, twice winner of the 24 Hours of Le Mans
 David Florence (born 1982), slalom canoeist
 Dario Franchitti (born 1973), Indy car driver
 Marino Franchitti (born 1978), American Le Mans driver
 Steve Frew (born 1973), gymnast, gold medallist in Commonwealth games 2002
 Adam Kelso Fulton (1929-1994), international rugby player
 Bernard Gallacher (born 1949), professional golfer
 Drew Galloway (born 1985), professional wrestler
 Richie Gray (born 1989), rugby player
 Jack Grimmer (born 1994), footballer
 Wyndham Halswelle (1882–1915), Olympic champion runner
 Dougal Haston (1940–1977), mountaineer
 Joe Hendry (1886–1966), footballer
 Stephen Hendry (born 1969), professional snooker player, 7 time world champion
 John Higgins (born 1975), professional snooker player, three-time world champion
 Chris Hoy (born 1976), world, Olympic and Commonwealth champion track cyclist
 Gerry Hughes (born 1958), sailor, first single-handed Atlantic crossing by a deaf person
 Gary Jacobs, Scottish, British, Commonwealth, and European (EBU) welterweight champion boxer
 Jimmy Johnstone (1944–2006), football player
 George Kerr (born 1937), judo expert, winner of the 1957 gold medal in the European Judo Championships
 John Kerr (born 1980), ice dancer
 Sinead Kerr (born 1978), ice dancer
 Dominic Kinnear (born 1967), former soccer player, now the head coach of Houston Dynamo in Major League Soccer
 Billy Kirkwood (born 1958), football player
 Martin Laird (born 1982), golfer
 Denis Law (born 1940), football player
 Paul Lawrie (born 1969), golfer, winner 1999 Open Championship
 Andrew Lemoncello (born 1982), long-distance runner
 Eric Liddell (1902–1945), athlete, one of the two subjects of Chariots of Fire
 Patricia Littlechild (born 1965), sport shooter
 Jackie Lockhart (born 1965), curler, skip of Scotland team which won the 2002 world championships
 Sandy Lyle (born 1958), golfer, winner of 1985 Open Championship and 1988 Masters Tournament
 Benny Lynch (1913–1946), world champion boxer
 Hamish MacInnes (1930–2020), mountaineer
 Craig MacLean (born 1971), world, Olympic and Commonwealth champion track cyclist
 Shona Marshall, sport shooter
 Rhona Martin (born 1966), curler, Olympic gold medallist
 Catriona Matthew (born 1969), golfer
 Ally McCoist (born 1962), football player
 Robert McCoig (1937–1998) badminton player. 
 James McFadden (born 1983), footballer
 William McGregor (1846–1911), founder of the Football League in England
 Neil McMenemy, triple jumper
 Jackie McNamara (born 1973), footballer and manager
 Billy McNeill (born 1940), footballer and a manager of Celtic F.C.
 Allan McNish (born 1969), racing driver
 Colin McRae (1968–2007), world champion rally driver
 Dick McTaggart (born 1935), boxer
 Micky Mellon (born 1972), ex-footballer, football manager
 David Millar (born 1977), road cyclist
 Robert Millar (born 1958), professional cyclist, "King of the Mountains" in 1984 Tour de France
 Willie Miller (born 1955), international footballer and captain of Aberdeen when they won the European Cup Winners' Cup in 1983
 Colin Montgomerie (born 1963), golfer, winner of European Tour Order of Merit a record 8 times
 Janice Moodie (born 1973), golfer
 Hugh Munro (1856–1919), mountaineer, known for his list of mountains
 Bernard Murphy (born 18??), footballer
 Andy Murray (born 1987), tennis player, singles, Wimbledon winner 2013, 2016 gentleman's singles, 2012 Olympic Champion, men's singles, US Open champion 2012, men's singles.
 Jamie Murray (born 1986), tennis player, doubles, Wimbledon winner 2007 mixed doubles
 Steve Nicol (born 1961), footballer, most notably of Liverpool F.C.
 Peter Niven (born 19??), jockey
 Graeme Obree (born 1965), world record holding cyclist
 Stewart Pitt (born 1968), slalom canoeist
 Graeme Randall (born 1975), judo expert, World Judo Championships gold medallist
 Shirley Robertson (born 1968), sailor and Olympic gold medallist
 Bill Shankly (1913–1981), one of Liverpool F.C.'s most successful managers
 Graeme Souness (born 1953), football player and manager
 Ian Stark (born 1954), equestrian
 Jock Stein (1922–1985), football manager, won the European Cup with Celtic F.C.
 Sir Jackie Stewart (born 1939), world champion Formula One driver
 Frederick Guthrie Tait (1870–1900), amateur golfer and soldier
 Bobby Thomson (1923–2010), Scots-born American baseball player
 Sam Torrance (born 1953), golfer
 Lawrence Tynes (born 1978), Scots-born kicker for the New York Giants and Kansas City Chiefs
 Steven Vidler (born 1977), middleweight judo expert, Commonwealth games bronze medallist
 Andrew Watson (born 1857), world's first black international football player, captain and administrator
 Jim Watt (born 1948), world champion boxer, won the WBC World Lightweight title
 Harry Weld-Forester (born 1981), cricketer
 David Wilkie (born 1954), swimmer
 Jocky Wilson (1950–2012), world professional darts champion in 1982 and 1989
 Mike Zagorski (born 1979), cyclist

Television and radio personalities
 Kaye Adams (born 1962)
 Ronni Ancona (born 1968)
 Dougie Anderson (born 1976)
 Fiona Armstrong (born 1956)
 Jackie Bird (born 1962)
 Edith Bowman (born 1975)
 Frankie Boyle (born 1972), comedian
 Gordon Buchanan (born 1972), wildlife filmmaker
 Bryan Burnett, television and radio presenter
 Nicky Campbell (born 1962)
 Kelly Cates (born 1975)
 Kate Copstick
 Stuart Cosgrove (born 1952)
 Tam Cowan (born 1969)
 Cat Cubie (born 1981)
 Romana D'Annunzio (born 1972)
 Jim Delahunt
 Dominik Diamond (born 1969)
 Jack Docherty (born 1962)
 John Dunn (1934–2004), radio presenter
 Kieron Elliot
 Jenni Falconer (born 1976)
 Craig Ferguson (born 1962)
 Tommy Flanagan (born 1965)
 Sandy Gall (born 1927)
 Kirsty Gallacher (born 1976)
 George Galloway (born 1954)
 Graeme Garden (born 1943)
 Muriel Gray (born 1959), journalist
 Amanda Hamilton (born 1974)
 Sarah Heaney (born 1971)
 Stuart Henry (1942–1995), disc jockey
 Mikey Hughes (born 1974)
 Hazel Irvine (born 1965)
 Stephen Jardine (born 1963)
 Alan Johnston (born 1962), journalist
 Nicci Jolly (born 1981)
 Lorraine Kelly (born 1959)
 Fiona Kennedy
 Ross King (born 1961)
 John Leslie (born 1965)
 Viv Lumsden (born 1952)
 Fred MacAulay (born 1956)
 Cathy MacDonald
 Phil MacHugh (born 1985)
 Sarah Mack (born 1973)
 John MacKay
 Aggie MacKenzie (born 1955)
 Sally Magnusson (born 1955)
 Eddie Mair (born 1965)
 Andrew Marr (born 1959)
 Colin McAllister (born 1968)
 Ian McCaskill (1938–2016)
 Scottie McClue (born 1956)
 Sheena McDonald (born 1954)
 Gail McGrane (born 1975)
 Paul McGuire
 Gillian McKeith (born 1959)
 Andrea McLean (born 1969)
 Rhona McLeod
 Michelle McManus (born 1980)
 Cameron McNeish
 Aasmah Mir (born 1971)
 Paul Mitchell (born 1968)
 Arthur Montford (1929–2014)
 Nick Nairn (born 1959), celebrity chef
 Shereen Nanjiani (born 1961)
 Neil Oliver (born 1967)
 Dawn Porter (born 1979)
 Gail Porter (born 1971)
 Angus Purden (born 1974)
 Judith Ralston
 Gordon Ramsay (born 1966), celebrity chef
 Heather Reid (born 1969)
 Fyfe Robertson (1902–1987)
 Tom Russell (born 1948)
 Justin Ryan (born 1967)
 Isla St Clair (born 1952)
 Catriona Shearer (born 1981)
 Angus Simpson
 Carol Smillie (born 1961)
 Sarah Smith (born 1968)
 Iain Stirling (born 1988)
 Grant Stott
 Cameron Stout (born 1971)
 Heather Suttie
 Brian Taylor (born 1955)
 Bill Torrance (born 1946)
 Alison Walker (born 1963)
 Kirsty Wark (born 1955), journalist
 Tom Weir (1914–2006)
 Jim White
 Kirsty Young (born 1968)

Theologians, pastors and missionaries

 David Laird Adams (1837–1892), minister and  academic, professor of Hebrew and oriental languages at the University of Edinburgh.
 Patrick Adamson, 16th-century Archbishop of St Andrews
 Reverend William Menzies Alexander (1858–1929), medical and theological writer, Professor of Divinity
 Tom Allan (died 1965), minister and evangelist, pioneer of practical church outreach in social work, primarily in the city of Glasgow
 Charles Arbuthnot (1737–1820), Scottish abbot of the Scots Monastery, Regensburg
 George Husband Baird (1761–1840), minister, educational reformer, linguist and Principal of the University of Edinburgh
 Donald Macpherson Baillie (1887–1954), theologian, ecumenist, and parish minister
 John Baillie (1886–1960), theologian and Church of Scotland minister
 James Bannerman, (1807–1868), Free Church of Scotland theologian
 William Barclay (1907–1978), author, Church of Scotland minister, Professor of Divinity and Biblical Criticism at the University of Glasgow
 James Barr (1924–2006)
 John Blackadder (c. 1622–1685), eminent Presbyterian Covenanter preacher
 Robert Blackadder (died 1508), first archbishop of Glasgow 
 Hugh Blair (1718–1800), minister of religion, author and rhetorician
 James Blair (1656–1743), Church of England clergyman, missionary and founder of the College of William & Mary, in Williamsburg, Virginia
 Robert Blair (1837–1907), Church of Scotland minister
 David Bogue (1750–1825), nonconformist leader, and missionary to Penang
 Thomas Boston (1676–1732), pastor and theologian
 Claudius Buchanan (1766–1815), theologian, minister of the Church of England, and missionary to India
 William Chalmers Burns (1815–1868), revival preacher, missionary to China
 Richard Cameron (c. 1648–1680), a leader of the Covenanters
 Andrew Cant (1590–1663), Presbyterian minister and leader of the Covenanters
 Very Rev Alexander Carlyle (1722–1805), church leader, and autobiographer
 James Chalmers (1841–1901), missionary, active in New Guinea
 Dugald Christie (1855–1936), medical missionary in Mukden, China
 William Robinson Clark (1829–1912), Dean of Taunton and later professor in Toronto
 Thomas Richardson Colledge (1796–1879), medical missionary in China, founder and first president of the Medical Missionary Society of China
 Daniel "Dan" Crawford (1870–1926), known as 'Konga Vantu', missionary of the Plymouth Brethren in central-southern Africa
 William Cunningham (1805–1861), leading Free Church pastor and professor
 David Dickson (c. 1583–1663), theologian and Covenanter
 David Dickson (1780–1842), minister and writer
 John Dudgeon (1837–1901), doctor, surgeon, translator, and medical missionary
 Rev Alexander Duff (1806–1878), first overseas missionary of the Church of Scotland to India
 Ebenezer Erskine (1680–1754), minister whose actions led to the establishment of the Secession Church
 Ralph Erskine (1685–1752), preacher and poet
 Andrew Martin Fairbairn (1838–1912), theological scholar, principal of Mansfield College, Oxford
 Patrick Fairbairn (1805–1874), minister and theologian
 Henry Faulds (1843–1930), missionary to Japan, physician, and scientist noted for the development of fingerprinting
 Alexander Penrose Forbes (1817–1875)
 George Hay Forbes (1821–1875), priest of the Scottish Episcopal Church, founder of the Pitsligo Press
 John Forbes (1571–1606), Capuchin friar, known as Father Archangel
 Peter Taylor Forsyth (1848–1921), theologian, principal of Hackney College, London
 James Frazer (1854–1941), anthropologist of comparative religion and myth
 Alexander Geddes (1737–1802), theologian and scholar
 Alexander Gerard (1728–1795), minister, academic and philosophical writer
 John George Govan (1861–1927), founder of the Faith Mission
 Patrick Graham, (d 1478), first Archbishop of St Andrews
 Daniel Gunn (1774–1848), Scottish congregational minister, latterly in Christchurch, Hampshire
 Thomas Guthrie (1803–1873), divine and philanthropist
 William Guthrie (1620–1665), author of "The Christian's Great Interest"
 James Alexander Haldane (1768–1851), independent church leader
 Robert Haldane (1764–1842), missionary preacher and lecturer; wrote a commentary on Romans
 Patrick Hamilton (1504–1528), first Protestant martyr in Scotland, burnt at the stake in 1528
 William Hastie (1842–1903), clergyman, theologian and translator of the Universal Natural History and Theory of Heaven by Immanuel Kant
 Alexander Henderson (1583–1646)
 James Hog (c. 1658–1734), minister at Carnock, known for his role in the Marrow controversy within the Church of Scotland
 Richard Holloway (born 1933)
 William Irvine (1863–1947), evangelist and founder of the Cooneyite and Two by Two sects
 Robert Reid Kalley (1809–1888), physician and Presbyterian missionary notable for work in Portuguese-speaking territories
 Dr John Kennedy (1819–1884), Highland preacher, author of Days of the Fathers in Ross-shire
 John Knox (c. 1513–1572), leader of the Scottish Reformation
 Thomas Leishman (1825–1904), minister and liturgical scholar
 David Lindsay, 1st Duke of Montrose (1440–1495), first Scottish non-royal duke, Lord High Admiral of Scotland, Master of the Royal Household of Scotland, Great Chamberlain and Justiciar
 David Livingstone (1813–1873), missionary and explorer in Africa
 Alexander Mackay (1849–1890), Presbyterian missionary to Uganda
 Hugh Martin (1822–1885), pastor and writer
 Matilda, Countess of Angus, (fl 13th century), heiress of Maol Choluim, countess in her own right
 Robert Murray M'Cheyne (1813–1843), minister of the Gospel, missionary to the Jewish people
 Thomas M'Crie the Elder (1772–1835), pastor and historian (wrote the 'Life of John Knox')
 William Milligan (1821–1892), theologian, professor at the University of Aberdeen
 Robert Moffat (1795–1883), missionary to Africa
 Saint Mungo (also known as Saint Kentigern) (died 614)
 John Murray (1898–1975), Calvinist theologian and Presbyterian minister
 George Newlands
 John Paton (1824–1907), Protestant missionary to the New Hebrides Islands of the South Pacific
 Alexander Peden (1626–1686), leading figures in the Covenanter movement
 William Pettigrew (1869–1943), missionary to the Tangkhul Naga
 Dr John Philip (1775–1851), missionary in South Africa
 Robert Pont (or Kylpont) (1524–1606), reformer, lord of session, minister in Edinburgh and St. Andrews
 The Revd Professor Norman Walker Porteous (1898–2003), translator of the Bible
 Andrew Purves (born 1946), theologian
 James Renwick (1662–1688), covenanter and martyr
 Samuel Rutherford (c. 1600–1661), Presbyterian pastor, theologian and author, one of the Scottish Commissioners to the Westminster Assembly
 John Duns Scotus (c. 1266–1308)
 James Sharp (1613–1679), assassinated Archbishop of St Andrews
 John Simson (c. 1668–1740), New Licht theologian, involved in a long investigation for heresy
 Mary Slessor (1848–1915), missionary and advocate for women's rights
 George Washington Sprott (1829–1909), minister and liturgical scholar
 George Thomson (1819–1878), missionary and botanist in Cameroon
 Thomas Torrance (1871–1959), missionary to China
 Thomas F. Torrance (1913–2007), theologian
 James Wedderburn (1585–1639), bishop of Dunblane, grandson of the poet James Wedderburn
 John Welsh of Ayr (1568–1622), pastor exiled for faithful preaching; son-in-law to John Knox
 John Willock (c. 1515–1585), Protestant reformer
 George Wishart (1513–1546), Protestant reformer and martyr

Writers

Other notable people

 John Adair (c. 1655–1722), surveyor and cartographer
 Dr Hely Hutchinson Almond (1832–1903), educator and rugby union promoter
 Jane Arthur (1827–1907), feminist and activist
 Col. David Barclay (1610–1686), 1st Laird of Urie, a convert to Quakerism
 Robert Barclay (1648–1690), Quaker, governor of the East Jersey colony
 Andrew Bell (1753–1832), developer of the Madras system of education
 Harry Benson (born 1929), celebrity and pop culture photographer
 John Boyd (1925–2018), milliner based in London
 James Braidwood (1800–1861), founder of the world's first municipal fire service in Edinburgh in 1824, and first director of the London Fire Engine Establishment
 Thomas Braidwood (1715–1806), teacher of the deaf
 John Brown (1826–1883), servant of Queen Victoria
 John Brown (1627–1685), Covenanter martyr
 Kenn Burke, ballet dancer
 John Cairncross (1913–1995), intelligence officer and spy during World War II, alleged to be the fifth member of the Cambridge Five
 Charles Cameron (1927–2001), magician, godfather of bizarre magic
 Ajahn Candasiri (born 1947), Theravāda Buddhist nun who co-founded Chithurst Buddhist Monastery
 Michael Caton-Jones (born 1957), film director
 William Chambers (born 1979), award-winning hat designer
 Walter Chepman (fl. c. 1500), merchant, notary and civil servant; in partnership with Androw Myllar in Scotland's first printing press
 Mary Crudelius (née Maclean, 1839–1877), campaigner for women's education, and a supporter of women's suffrage
 Alexander Cruden (1699–1770), compiler of an early concordance to the Bible
 Lord Curriehill (1549–1617), prosecutor, ambassador, and judge
 Alexander Dalrymple (1737–1808), geographer and the first Hydrographer of the British Admiralty
 James Dawson (1806–1900), prominent champion of Australian Aborigines' interests
 Dervorguilla of Galloway (c. 1210–1290), a 'lady of substance' in 13th-century Scotland, mother of king John I of Scotland, and founder of Sweetheart Abbey
 Alexander Donaldson (1727–1794), appellant in the copyright case, Donaldson v Beckett; founder/publisher of the Edinburgh Advertiser
 James Donaldson (1751–1830), publisher of the Edinburgh Advertiser; founder of Donaldson's Hospital
 Bill Douglas (1934–1991), film director
 The Rev. John Archibald Dunbar-Dunbar (1849–1905), philatelist, one of the "Fathers of Philately"
 Helen Duncan (1897–1956), last woman to be tried under the Witchcraft Act
 William Dunlop (c. 1654–1700), Covenanter, adventurer, and Principal of the University of Glasgow
 John Fairbairn (1794–1864), newspaper proprietor, educator, financier and politician of the Cape Colony
 Sir David Ferrier (1843–1928), pioneering neurologist and psychologist
 Donald Findlay (born 1951)
 John Finlaison (1783–1860), first president of the Institute of Actuaries
 Alexander Kinloch Forbes (1821–1865), scholar of the Gujarati language
 William Forsyth (1737–1804), horticulturist, founding member of the Royal Horticultural Society, after whom the genus Forsythia is named
 Lord Fountainhall (1646–1722), one of Scotland's leading jurists
 Alexander Yule Fraser (1857–1890), mathematician, one of the founders of the Edinburgh Mathematical Society 
 Jenny Geddes (c. 1600–c. 1660), market trader, threw a stool at the Dean of Edinburgh in protest against the new prayer book
 Patrick Geddes (1854–1932), biologist, sociologist, geographer, philanthropist and pioneering town planner
 Sir Andrew Gilchrist (1910–1993), diplomat
 Gilleasbaig of Menstrie (fl. 13th century), earliest attested member Campbell family, father of Sir Colin Campbell
 Ewen Gillies (born 1825), serial emigrant and adventurer from St. Kilda, Scotland
 Anna Gordon or Brown (1747–1810), ballad collector
 Robert Gordon of Straloch (1580–1661), cartographer, poet, mathematician, antiquary, and geographer
 Janet Gourlay (1863–1912) Egyptologist, born in Glasgow
 Patrick Grant (born 1972), fashion designer
 Angelica Gray (born 1990), model
 Alasdair George Hay (born 1961), first and current Chief Fire Officer of the Scottish Fire and Rescue Service
 Robert Hay (1799–1863), traveller, antiquarian, and Egyptologist
 Margaret Henderson (1921–2007), Scottish dancer
 Amanda Hendrick (born 1990), model
 William Vallance Douglas Hodge (1903–1975), mathematician, geometer
 Isobel Hoppar (born c. 1490), landowner, governess and political figure
 John Horrocks (1816–1881), founder and innovator of modern European fly fishing
 Kirsty Hume (born 1976), model
 Sir John Ritchie Inch (1911–1993), police officer, Chief Constable of Edinburgh City Police
 David Jones (born 1966), games programmer and entrepreneur, known for creating the Grand Theft Auto video game franchise
 Princess Kaiulani Cleghorn of Hawaii (1876–1899), daughter of Archibald Cleghorn and Princess Miriam Likelike (sister of Queen Lili'iuokalani)
 Christopher Kane (born 1982), fashion designer
 James Kennedy (1930–1973), security guard for British Rail Engineering Limited, posthumously awarded the George Cross
 Simon Somerville Laurie (1829–1909), educator
 Mikhail Lermontov, 19th-century Russian author of Scottish origin
 Hercules Linton (1837–1900), surveyor, designer, shipbuilder, antiquarian and local councillor, designer of the Cutty Sark
 James Loch (1780–1855), economist, advocate, barrister, estate commissioner
 Sir Robert Hamilton Bruce Lockhart (1887–1970), diplomat, journalist and secret agent
 Mary Lyon (1797–1849), first woman principal in America
 Flora Macaulay (1859–1958), editor of The Oban Times newspaper 
 Flora MacDonald (1722–1790), Jacobite and United Empire Loyalist
 Gillies MacKinnon, film director, writer and painter
 Iain Macmillan (1938–2006), photographer, took the photograph for The Beatles' album Abbey Road
 Jamie Macpherson (1675–1700), outlaw and author of MacPherson's Lament or Rant
 Dame Sarah Elizabeth Siddons Mair (1846–1941), campaigner for women's education and women's suffrage
 Gary McKinnon (born 1966), computer hacker
 Lorna McNee, chef
 Robert McQueen, Lord Braxfield (1722–1799), advocate and judge
 James Murdoch (1856–1921), journalist and teacher
 William McMaster Murdoch (1873–1912), First Officer aboard the RMS Titanic
 Keith Murray, Baron Murray of Newhaven (1903–1993), academic and Rector of Lincoln College, Oxford
 Androw Myllar (fl.1503–1508), first Scottish printer, in partnership with Walter Chepman
 Eunice Olumide (born 1987), model
 James Orrock (1829–1913), collector of art and Oriental ceramics
 Robert Paterson (1715–1801), stonemason, who suggested to Sir Walter Scott the character of "Old Mortality"
 Duncan Phyfe (1770–1854), United States most celebrated cabinetmaker
 Natalie Pike (born 1983), model
 James Pillans (1778–1864), classical scholar and educational reformer
 Allan Pinkerton (1819–1884), North American detective
 Timothy Pont (c. 1565–1614), cartographer and topographer, the first to produce a detailed map of Scotland
 John Charles Walsham Reith (1889–1971), first Director General of the BBC
 John Rennie (1842–1918), naval architect, Naval Constructor and Instructor for the Chinese Government
 Jonathan Saunders, fashion designer
 James Small (1835–1900), last laird of Dirnanean
 Archibald Smith (1813–1872), mathematician and lawyer
 William Stewart Easton Stephen (1903–1975), philatelist
 Flora Stevenson (1839–1905), social reformer, interested in education
 Louisa Stevenson (1835–1908), campaigner for women's university education, women's suffrage and well-organised nursing
 Jock Stewart (1918–1989), executioner
 Charlotte Carmichael Stopes (1840–1929), author, and campaigner for women's rights
 Marie Charlotte Carmichael Stopes (1880–1958), author, palaeobotanist and campaigner for eugenics and women's rights
 John Guthrie Tait (1861–1945), educator, principal of the Central College of Bangalore, and sportsman
 Stella Tennant (born 1970), model 
 Mary Anne MacLeod Trump (born 1912), philanthropist, mother of Donald Trump
 John Thomson (1837–1921), photographer
 James Tytler (1745–1804), apothecary, editor of the second edition of Encyclopædia Britannica; first person in Britain to fly (by ascending in a hot air balloon)
 John Walker (1731–1803), minister of religion, natural historian and professor
 Albert Watson (born 1942), fashion and celebrity photographer
 Alexander Wilson (died 1922), noted amateur photographer, working in Dundee
 Margaret Wilson (c. 1667–1685), Covenanter martyr
 Roderick Wright (1940–2005), disgraced Catholic bishop

See also

 Biographical Dictionary of Eminent Scotsmen (1857)
 List of fictional Scots
 List of women Senators of the College of Justice 
 Scottish Diaspora 
 Scottish Americans 
 Scotch-Irish Americans
 Scottish Australians 
 Scottish Argentines 
 Scottish Brazilians 
 Scots-Quebecer
 Scottish Canadians 
 Scottish New Zealanders

References

Lists of British people